= Activated protein C resistance test =

- Synonyms: APC resistance test; Activated protein C resistance assay; APC resistance assay; APCR test; APCR assay
- Test of: Activated protein C resistance, coagulation, hypercoagulability

The activated protein C resistance (APCR) test is a coagulation test used in the evaluation and diagnosis of activated protein C (APC) resistance, a form of hypercoagulability. Hereditary APC resistance is usually caused by the factor V Leiden mutation, whereas acquired APC resistance has been linked to antiphospholipid antibodies, pregnancy, and estrogen therapy. APC resistance can be measured using either an activated partial thromboplastin time (aPTT)-based test or an endogenous thrombin potential (ETP)-based test.

== Methodology ==
The aPTT-based APC resistance test involves a modified aPTT test performed in the presence and absence of activated protein C (APC). The ratio of these aPTT values is calculated and is called the APC sensitivity ratio (APCsr) or simply APC ratio (APCr). This ratio is inversely related to the degree of APC resistance. The ETP-based APC resistance test involves the addition of APC to a thrombin generation assay (TGA). This results in an inhibition of thrombin generation as measured by reduction of the endogenous thrombin potential (ETP; area under the thrombin generation curve). The result is expressed as a normalized APC sensitivity ratio (nAPCsr), which corresponds to the ratio of the ETP measured in the presence and absence of APC divided by the same ratio in reference plasma. nAPCsr values range from 0 to 10. Opposite to the case of the APCsr with the aPTT-based APC resistance test, higher nAPCsr values indicate greater APC resistance. This is the result of the fact that APC prolongs the aPTT but inhibits thrombin generation.

Whereas the aPTT-based APC resistance test only measures the initiation phase of coagulation, the ETP-based test is a global assay and measures the initiation, propagation, and termination phases of coagulation. The initiation phase accounts for less than 5% of total thrombin generation, making aPTT-based tests poorly indicative of hypercoagulability in general. The aPTT-based assay is more sensitive to levels of prothrombin and factor VIII, whereas the ETP-based test is more sensitive to levels of tissue factor pathway inhibitor (TFPI) and protein S. The ETP-based test has traditionally been performed using methods such as the calibrated automated thrombogram (CAT) and has been limitedly available due to its technical difficulty. Recently however, a fully automated commercial test system called the ST Genesia has been introduced, and it has been said that this should allow for adoption of TGAs and ETP-based APC resistance tests in routine clinical settings.

== Influences ==
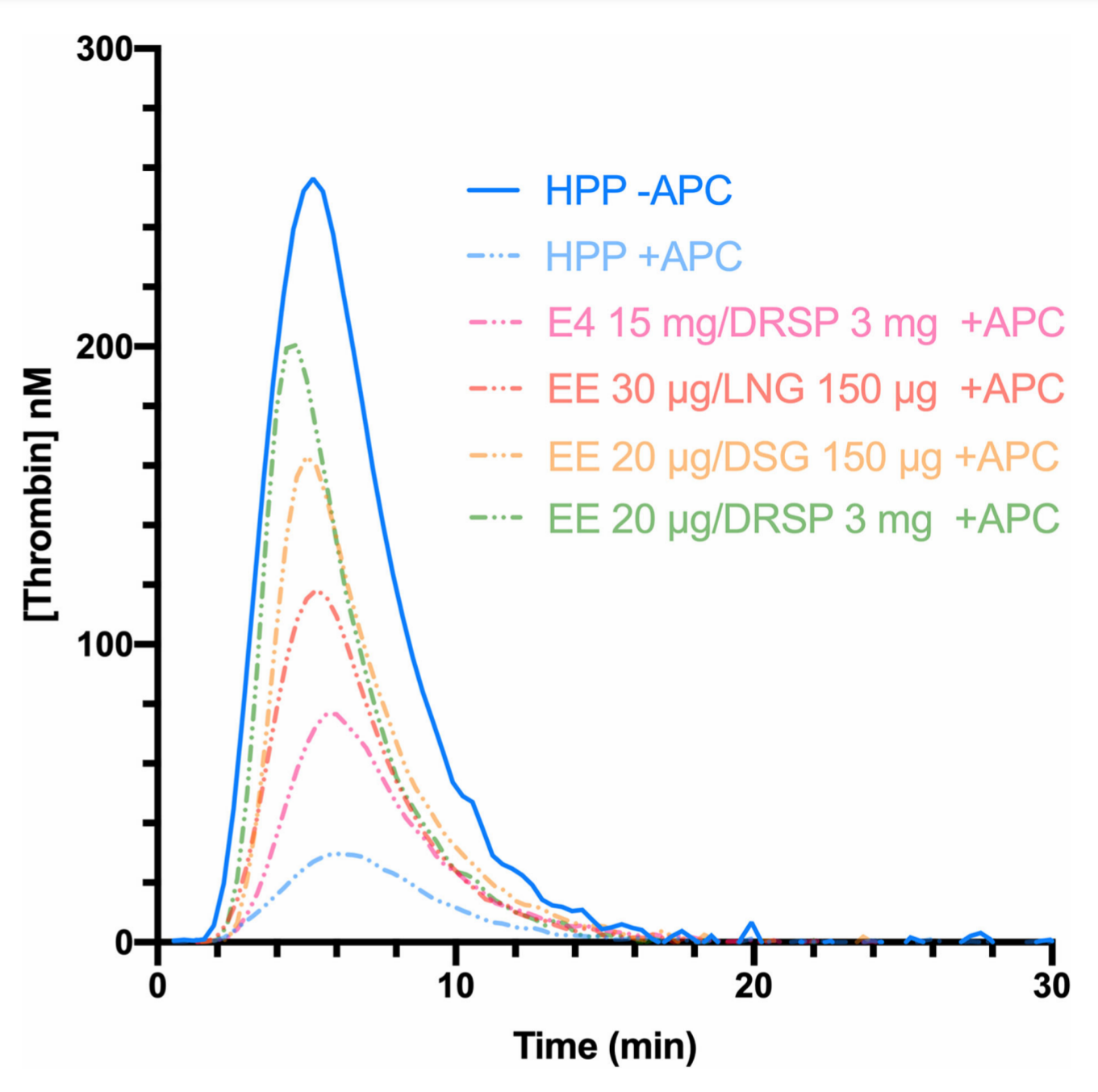
Thrombin generation curves in the absence (HPP -APC) and presence (HPP +APC) of activated protein C (APC) in healthy pooled plasma and in plasma of women on various combined oral contraceptives. The contraceptives are estetrol/drospirenone (E4/DRSP), ethinylestradiol/levonorgestrel (EE/LNG), ethinylestradiol/desogestrel (EE/DSG), and ethinylestradiol/drospirenone (EE/DRSP).

Estrogens are well known to increase APC resistance, which has been described as acquired APC resistance. However, the aPTT-based APC resistance test is much less sensitive to the procoagulatory effects of estrogens than is the ETP-based test. Pregnancy and ethinylestradiol (EE)-containing combined birth control pills increase APC resistance as measured by either the aPTT- or ETP-based test. EE-containing birth control pills show different degrees of influence on the ETP-based test depending on the progestin, which may be due to varying degrees of androgenic antagonism of ethinylestradiol-mediated procoagulation. In contrast to EE-containing birth control pills, studies have not found increased APC resistance with menopausal hormone therapy or with estetrol- or estradiol-containing birth control pills using the aPTT-based test, though increased APC resistance has been shown with the ETP-based test. The increase in APC resistance is much greater with oral estrogens than with transdermal estradiol. Increased APC resistance with both the aPTT-based and ETP-based tests has been observed with feminizing hormone therapy in transgender women, which involves higher doses of estradiol than are used in other contexts. EE produces a much stronger increase in APC resistance than does estradiol. In relation to this, ethinylestradiol is associated with a higher risk of venous thromboembolism (VTE) than is estradiol.

== History ==
The aPTT-based APC resistance test was developed in 1993, while the ETP-based test was developed in 1997. For many years, the ETP-based APC resistance test suffered from a lack of standardization which hampered study-to-study comparison. By 2020 however, a validated methodology was developed aiming to propose a standardized and harmonized scale for ETP-based APC resistance, the normalized activated protein C sensitivity ratio (nAPCsr).
