= Superficial vein thrombosis =

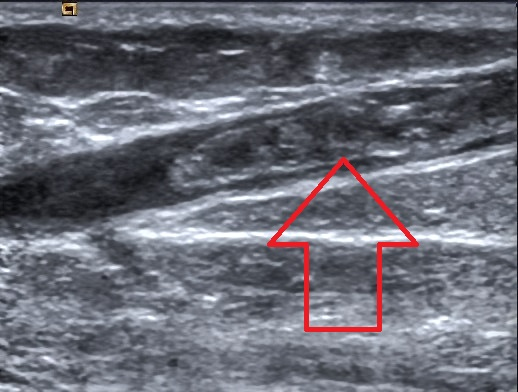
- Great saphenous vein thrombosis
- Specialty: Vascular surgery
- Symptoms: Pain, redness, and a palpable cord at the site of the blood clot.
- Complications: May propagate to deeper veins where it can form a deep vein thrombosis or pulmonary embolism
- Risk factors: An indwelling venous catheter is a risk factor for SVT in the arms. Venous stasis (such as from varicose veins, chronic venous insufficiency, or venous reflux) is a major risk factor for SVT in the legs. Other risk factors include pregnancy, cancer, trauma to limb, recent surgery, history of venous thromboembolism, hypercoagulability (thrombophilia) and recent immobilization of a limb.
- Diagnostic method: May be made as a clinical diagnosis based on signs and symptoms. In other cases a venous duplex ultrasound establishes the diagnosis.
- Differential diagnosis: Deep venous thrombosis, soft tissue infections such as cellulitis, insect bites, inflammation of superficial veins without blood clot (superficial phlebitis), lymphangitis, erythema nodosum
- Treatment: Low risk SVT: pain management. High risk (high risk of blood clots in deeper veins): blood thinners.
- Medication: Blood thinners such as fondaparinux, rivaroxaban, low-molecular weight heparins such as enoxaparin. Symptomatic relief: topical or oral Non-steroidal anti-inflammatory drugs (caution of bleeding if combined with blood thinners)

Superficial vein thrombosis (SVT) is a blood clot formed in a superficial vein; a vein near the surface of the body. Usually there is thrombophlebitis, which is an inflammatory reaction around a thrombosed vein, presenting as a painful induration (thickening of the skin) with redness. SVTs have a lower disability and mortality risk compared to deep vein thrombosis (DVT), which occur deeper in the body at the deep venous system and have a greater risk of travelling to the lungs as pulmonary emboli. However, SVTs carry a risk of propagating (spreading) to become DVTs, which may then develop into PEs. If the blood clot is too near the saphenofemoral junction there is a higher risk of pulmonary embolism, a potentially life-threatening complication.

SVTs commonly occur in the arms and legs. The great saphenous vein (73% of lower extremity clots) and the small saphenous vein (25.7%) are the most commonly involved leg veins to develop SVTs. The cephalic vein (57% of upper extremity clots) and the basilic vein (14%) are the most common veins involved in SVTs of the arms. Blood pooling in the veins of the legs (due to inadequacy of veins to return blood to the heart) is a major risk factor for SVTs of the legs. Common causes of chronic venous insufficiency include varicose veins, or dysfunction of the venous valves causing blood pooling in the legs. Whereas placement of peripheral venous catheters (usually for longer than 40 hours) is a major cause of SVTs in the arms. Other risk factors include pregnancy, cancer, trauma to a limb, recent surgery, history of deep vein thormobses, high predisposition to form blood clots (thrombophilia) and immobilization of a limb.

Diagnosis is often based on symptoms. However, a doppler ultrasound is recommended if the diagnosis is unclear of if there is concern for a high risk SVT (high risk of propagating to a DVT or PE).

Symptomatic treatment may involve compression stockings, heat applied to the area, topical pain relievers, oral pain relieves or elevation of the affected limb. For high risk disease, blood thinners are recommended.

== Signs and symptoms ==
SVT is recognized by the presence of pain, warmth, redness, and tenderness over a superficial vein. The SVT may present as a "cord-like" structure upon palpation. The affected vein may be hard along its entire length. SVTs tend to involve the legs, though they can affect any superficial vein (e.g. those in the arms).

In a subset of people, SVTs may not present with symptoms.

=== Complications ===
SVTs (especially those in the lower extremities) may spread to deeper veins and form deep vein thromboses (DVTs). These DVTs may also dislodge and travel to the lungs to form blood clots called pulmonary embolisms (PE). In a French population, the percent of people with SVTs that also suffered from PEs was 4.7%. In the same population, deep vein thrombosis (DVT) was found in 24.6% of people with SVTs. However, because superficial veins lack muscular support, any clots that form are far less likely to be squeezed by muscle contraction, dislodged, and induce a PE.

SVTs can recur after they resolve, which is termed "migratory thrombophlebitis." Migratory thrombophlebitis is a complication that may be due to more serious disorders, such as cancer and other hypercoagulable states. (Note: Migratory thrombophlebitis (recurrent SVT) and cancer are the hallmarks of Trousseau syndrome.)

== Causes ==
SVTs of the legs are often due to varicose veins, though most people with varicose veins do not develop SVTs. SVTs of the arms are often due to the placement of intravenous catheters.

Many of the risk factors that are associated with SVT are also associated with other thrombotic conditions (e.g. DVT). These risk factors include age, cancer, history of thromboembolism, pregnancy, use of oral contraceptive medications (containing estrogen), hormone replacement therapy, recent surgery, and certain autoimmune diseases (especially Behçet's and Buerger's diseases). Other risk factors include immobilization (stasis) and laparoscopy.

Hypercoagulable states due to genetic conditions that increase the risk of clotting may contribute to the development of SVT, such as factor V Leiden, prothrombin 20210A mutation, and protein C, S, and antithrombin III and factor XII deficiency.

== Mechanism ==
The mechanism for the development of an SVT depends upon the specific etiology of the SVT. For example, varicose veins and prolonged bed rest both may induce SVTs due to slowing the flow of blood through superficial veins.

== Diagnosis ==
SVTs may be diagnosed based upon characteristic signs and symptoms. A more specific evaluation can be made by doppler ultrasound. A doppler ultrasound can also detect high risk SVTs which are classified as SVTs spanning more than 5 cm, or SVTs spreading to within 3 cm of a junction with a deep vein (which are at a higher risk of forming DVTs or PEs). An ultrasound can be useful in situations in which an SVT occurs above the knee and is not associated with a varicose vein, because ultrasounds can detect more serious clots like DVTs. A blood test known as a D-dimer has been used to rule out DVTs or PEs, however it is not useful in the diagnosis or exclusion of SVTs.

=== Classification ===
SVTs can be classified as either varicose vein (VV) or non-varicose (NV) associated. NV-SVTs are more likely to be associated with genetic procoagulable states compared to VV-SVTs. SVTs can also be classified by pathophysiology. That is, primary SVTs are characterized by inflammation that is localized to the veins. Secondary SVTs are characterized by systemic inflammatory processes.

A subclass of SVTs are septic thrombophlebitis, which are SVTs that occur in the setting of an infection.

== Treatment ==
The goal of treatment in SVT is to reduce local inflammation and prevent the SVT from extending from its point of origin. Treatment may entail the use of compression, physical activity, medications, or surgical interventions. The optimal treatment for many SVT sites (i.e. upper limbs, neck, abdominal and thoracic walls, and the penis) has not been determined.

=== Compression ===
Multiple compression bandages exist. Fixed compression bandages, adhesive short stretch bandages, and graduated elastic compression stockings have all been used in the treatment of SVTs. The benefit of compression stockings is unclear, though they are frequently used.

=== Physical activity ===
Inactivity is contraindicated in the aftermath of an SVT. Uninterrupted periods of sitting or standing may cause the SVT to elongate from its point of origin, increasing the risk for complications and clinical worsening.

=== Medications ===
Medications used for the treatment of SVT include anticoagulants, NSAIDs (except aspirin), antibiotics, and corticosteroids.

==== Anticoagulants ====
SVTs that occur within the great saphenous vein within 3 cm of the saphenofemoral junction are considered to be equivalent in risk to DVTs. These high risk SVTs are treated identically with therapeutic anticoagulation. Anticoagulation is also used for intermediate risk SVTs that are greater than 3 cm from the saphenofemoral junction or are greater than 4–5 cm in length.

Anticoagulation for high risk SVTs includes the use of vitamin K antagonists or novel oral anticoagulants (NOACs) for 3 months. Anticoagulation for intermediate risk SVTs includes fondaparinux 2.5 mg daily for 45 days or the use of intermediate to therapeutic dose low molecular weight heparin for 4–6 weeks.

Anticoagulation in the treatment of SVTs has been demonstrated to prevent extension of the SVT, or the development of DVTs or PEs.

==== NSAIDs ====
NSAIDs (non-steroidal anti-inflammatory drugs) can be used in both oral or topical formulations for the relief of SVT symptoms. The British Committee for Standards in Haematology guidelines recommend the use of NSAIDs for low-risk SVTs (thrombus <4–5 cm in length, no additional risk factors for thromboembolic events). NSAIDs are used for treatment durations of 8–12 days.

==== Other ====
Antibiotics are used in the treatment of septic SVT. Corticosteroids are used for the treatment of SVTs in the setting of vasculitic and autoimmune syndromes.

=== Surgery ===
Surgical interventions are used for both symptomatic relief of the SVT as well as for preventing the development of more serious complications (e.g. pulmonary embolism). Surgical interventions include ligation of the saphenofemoral junction, ligation and stripping of the affected veins, and local thrombectomy. Because of the risk of symptomatic pulmonary embolism with surgery itself, surgical interventions are not recommended for the treatment of lower limb SVTs by the 2012 American College of Chest Physicians guidelines and the 2012 British Committee for Standards in Haematology guidelines. The use of surgery for the treatment of SVT is controversial.

Less invasive surgical procedures for SVTs include radiofrequency ablation or laser ablation of the superficial vein or injection of a substance to seal off the superficial vein that formed the clot (sclerotherapy).

The efficacy of surgery in the treatment of SVTs as compared to medication therapy with blood thinners is unknown.

There is a theoretical risk of more severe blood clots (DVTs and PEs) after surgery for SVT, but these risks have not been demonstrated in high quality trials. However, expert opinion is to consider blood thinners after surgical therapy for SVT to mitigate this risk.

== Prognosis ==
SVT is often a mild, self-resolving medical condition. The inflammatory reaction may last up to 2–3 weeks, with possible recanalization of the thrombosed vein occurring in 6–8 weeks. The superficial vein may continue to be hyperpigmented for several months following the initial event.

SVTs that occur in those with cancer, or those with a history of venous thromboembolism (DVTs and PEs) are associated with a worse prognosis; a higher rate of death, venous thromboembolism, or bleeding. SVTs that occur in the absence of varicose veins, in males, or SVTs that occur near the saphenofemoral popliteal junction (near the junction of deeper veins, where propagation of the clot may form DVTs and PEs) are also associated with a worse prognosis.

== Epidemiology ==
In a French population, SVT occurred in 0.64 per 1000 persons per year. Other estimates of the incidence of SVT are 0.64 to 1.31 cases per person years. It is more common in women (annual incidence 0.78-1.67 cases per 1,000 person years vs. 0.49-1.116 cases per 1,000 person years). The reason for increased incidence in women is unknown, but it is believed that the higher prevalence of varicose veins in women (50% vs. 30%), pregnancy, and the use of oral hormonal contraceptives (birth control pills), or postmenopausal hormone therapy may significantly contribute.

== History ==
SVTs have been historically considered to be benign diseases, for which treatment was limited to conservative measures. However, an increased awareness of the potential risks of SVTs developing into more serious complications has prompted more research into the diagnosis, classification, and treatment of SVTs.

== Research ==
A Cochrane review recommends that future research investigate the utility of oral, topical, and surgical treatments for preventing the progression of SVTs and the development of thromboembolic complications.
