= Calibrated automated thrombogram =

The calibrated automated thrombogram (CAT or CT) is a thrombin generation assay (TGA) and global coagulation assay (GCA) which can be used as a coagulation test to assess thrombotic risk. It is the most widely used TGA. The CAT is a semi-automated test performed in a 96-well plate and requires specialized technologists to be performed. As a result, it has seen low implementation in routine laboratories and has been more limited to research settings. Lack of standardization with the CAT has also led to difficulties in study-to-study comparisons in research. However, efforts have recently been made towards standardization of the assay. An example of a specific commercial CAT is the Thrombinoscope by Thrombinoscope BV (now owned by Diagnostica Stago).

The CAT can be used to measure thrombogram parameters such as the endogenous thrombin potential (ETP) and to assess activated protein C resistance (APCR). The CAT ETP-based APC resistance test is especially sensitive to estrogen-induced procoagulation, such as with combined oral contraceptives.

In 2018, a commercial fully automated TGA system and alternative to the CAT called the ST Genesia debuted. It has been said that this system should allow for more widespread adoption of TGAs in clinical laboratories. The ST Genesia system also shows improved reproducibility compared to the CAT.
