= Superficial thrombophlebitis =

- Other names: Superficial vein thrombosis (SVT)
- Superficial thrombophlebitis as seen by ultrasound

Superficial thrombophlebitis is a thrombosis and inflammation of superficial veins presenting as a painful induration (thickening) with erythema, often in a linear or branching configuration with a cordlike appearance.

Superficial thrombophlebitis is due to inflammation and/or thrombosis, and, less commonly, infection of the vein. It is generally a benign, self-limiting disorder; however, it can be complicated by deep vein thrombosis (DVT) and even pulmonary embolism (PE). Migratory superficial thrombophlebitis is known as Trousseau's syndrome, which can be an early sign of cancer.

When it (rarely) occurs on the breast or anterior chest wall it has been called Mondor's disease. It sometimes occurs in the arm or penis. In axilla, this condition is known as axillary web syndrome.

Mondor's disease

== Eponym ==
Mondor's disease is named after Henri Mondor (1885–1962), a surgeon in Paris, France who first described the disease in 1939.

== Signs and symptoms ==
Findings of tenderness, induration, pain, or erythema (redness) along the course of a superficial vein usually establish a clinical diagnosis, especially in patients with known risk factors. In addition, there is often a palpable, sometimes nodular "cord", due to thrombus (blood clot) within the affected vein. Persistence of this cord when the extremity is raised suggests the presence of thrombus.

On the chest wall, patients with this disease often have abrupt onset of superficial pain, with possible swelling and redness of a limited area of their anterior chest wall or breast. There is usually a lump present, which may be somewhat linear and tender. Because of the possibility of the lump being from another cause, patients are often referred for mammogram and/or breast ultrasound.

=== Complications ===
Superficial vein thrombosis (SVT) extension to the deep vein system and/or recurrence of SVT.

Suppurative thrombophlebitis is suspected when erythema extends significantly beyond the margin of the vein and is likely to be associated with significant fever. If suspected, antibiotic treatment, surgical drainage, and potentially vein excision are indicated.

Venous thromboembolism can occur with superficial vein thrombosis. Estimates of the percentage of patients with SVT who also have DVT vary between 6% and 53%, and symptomatic pulmonary embolism has been reported in 0% to 10% of patients with SVT. Deep venous system, and may lead to pulmonary embolism.

On the breast, there have been occasional cases of associated cancer.

== Risk factors ==
Patient characteristics and predisposing factors for thrombophlebitis nearly mirror those for DVT; thrombophlebitis is a risk factor for the development of DVT, and vice versa.

Lower extremity superficial phlebitis (inflamed vein) is associated with conditions that increase the risk of thrombosis, including abnormalities of coagulation or of fibrinolysis, endothelial dysfunction, infection, venous stasis, intravenous therapy, and intravenous drug use.

== Diagnosis ==
Blood clot seen on ultrasound of the dorsal penile vein

Clinical evaluation is the primary diagnostic tool for thrombophlebitis. People with thrombophlebitis complain of pain along the affected area. Some report constitutional symptoms, such as low-grade fever and aches. On physical examination, the skin over the affected vein exhibits erythema, warmth, swelling, and tenderness. Later in the disease, as induration subsides, erythema gives way to a ruddy or bruised color.

Duplex ultrasound identifies the presence, location and extent of venous thrombosis, and can help identify other pathology that may be a source of the patient's complaints. Ultrasound is indicated if superficial phlebitis involves or extends into the proximal one-third of the medial thigh, there is evidence for clinical extension of phlebitis, lower extremity swelling is greater than would be expected from a superficial phlebitis alone or diagnosis of superficial thrombophlebitis in question.

== Treatment ==
Treatment with compression stockings should be offered to patients with lower extremity superficial phlebitis, if not contraindicated (e.g., peripheral artery disease). Patients may find them helpful for reducing swelling and pain once the acute inflammation subsides.

Nonsteroidal anti-inflammatory drugs (NSAID) are effective in relieving the pain associated with venous inflammation and were found in a randomized trial to significantly decrease extension and/or recurrence of superficial vein thrombosis.

Anticoagulation is recommended for patients with lower extremity superficial thrombophlebitis at increased risk for thromboembolism (affected venous segment of ≥5 cm, in proximity to deep venous system, positive medical risk factors).

Treatment with fondaparinux reduces the risk of subsequent venous thromboembolism.

Surgery is reserved for patients with extension of the clot to within 1 cm of the saphenofemoral junction, in patients deemed unreliable for anticoagulation, upon failure of anticoagulation, and in patients with intense pain. Surgical therapy with ligation of the saphenofemoral junction or stripping of thrombosed superficial veins appears to be associated with higher rates of venous thromboembolism compared with treatment with anticoagulants.

== Epidemiology ==
Some 125,000 cases a year have been reported in the United States, but actual incidence of spontaneous thrombophlebitis is unknown. A fourfold increased incidence from the third to the eight decade in men and a preponderance among women of approximately 55-70%. The average mean age of affected patients is 60 years.

Thrombophlebitis can develop along the arm, back, or neck veins, the leg is by far the most common site. When it occurs in the leg, the great saphenous vein is usually involved, although other locations are possible.

== See also ==
- Septic thrombophlebitis
- Superficial vein thrombosis
