= Björn Dahlbäck =

Swedish Doctor

Björn Dahlbäck (born 1949) is a Swedish physician, medical researcher, and professor of clinical chemistry, specializing in hematology and the molecular mechanisms of blood coagulation. He determined that activated protein C (APC) resistance is the most common inherited risk factor of venous thrombosis.

== Education and career ==
Dahlbäck graduated with an M.D. from Lund University and then completed his medical internship and residency at Malmö's University Hospital, which is now merged into Skåne University Hospital. In 1981 he received from Lund University his doctorate with dissertation The activation of prothrombin on the platelet surface under the supervision of Johan Stenflo. Dahlbäck was a postdoc at La Jolla's Scripps Research, where his supervisor was Hans J. Müller-Eberhard, and later was a visiting scholar at Oklahoma Medical Research Foundation (OMRF). In 1989 at Lund University, Dahlbäck was appointed a full professor of clinical chemistry, specializing in hematology and cardiac and cardiovascular systems. He is also the director of the blood coagulation unit at Malmö General Hospital.

His research was important in showing that APC resistance is caused by a harmful mutation in the F5 gene corresponding to the protein Factor V; the specific mutation was subsequently identified by several groups of researchers and is now called Factor V Leiden. In 2013, Dahlbäck and colleagues identified the F5 gene mutation that causes the phenotype called "east Texas bleeding disorder".

He has received several honors and awards, including in 1996 the Louis-Jeantet Prize for Medicine and in 2019 H. M. The King's Medal (H.M. Konungens Medalj) of the 12th size from the Royal Court of Sweden. He is a member of the Royal Swedish Academy of Sciences.

In 2000, Academic Press published Hematology: Landmark Papers of the Twentieth Century , which included the 1994 paper Resistance to activated protein C as a basis for venous thrombosis by Peter J. Svensson and Björn Dahlbäck.

== Selected publications ==
- Dahlback, B.; Stenflo, J. (1981). "High molecular weight complex in human plasma between vitamin K-dependent protein S and complement component C4b-binding protein". Proceedings of the National Academy of Sciences. 78 (4): 2512–2516. Bibcode:1981PNAS...78.2512D. doi:10.1073/pnas.78.4.2512. PMC 319377. PMID 6454142.
- Suzuki, K.; Dahlbäck, B.; Stenflo, J. (1982). "Thrombin-catalyzed activation of human coagulation factor V". Journal of Biological Chemistry. 257 (11): 6556–6564. doi:10.1016/S0021-9258(20)65178-X. PMID 7076681.
- Suzuki, K.; Stenflo, J.; Dahlbäck, B.; Teodorsson, B. (1983). "Inactivation of human coagulation factor V by activated protein C". Journal of Biological Chemistry. 258 (3): 1914–1920. doi:10.1016/S0021-9258(18)33076-X. PMID 6687387.
- Dahlbäck, Björn (1991). "Protein S and C4b-Binding Protein: Components Involved in the Regulation of the Protein C Anticoagulant System". Thrombosis and Haemostasis. 66 (1): 049–061. doi:10.1055/s-0038-1646373. PMID 1833851. S2CID 24929072.
- Dahlback, B.; Carlsson, M.; Svensson, P. J. (1993). "Familial thrombophilia due to a previously unrecognized mechanism characterized by poor anticoagulant response to activated protein C: Prediction of a cofactor to activated protein C". Proceedings of the National Academy of Sciences. 90 (3): 1004–1008. Bibcode:1993PNAS...90.1004D. doi:10.1073/pnas.90.3.1004. PMC 45799. PMID 8430067.
- Zöller, B.; Svensson, P. J.; He, X.; Dahlbäck, B. (1994). "Identification of the same factor V gene mutation in 47 out of 50 thrombosis-prone families with inherited resistance to activated protein C". Journal of Clinical Investigation. 94 (6): 2521–2524. doi:10.1172/JCI117623. PMC 330087. PMID 7989612.
- Dahlback, B.; Hildebrand, B. (1994). "Inherited resistance to activated protein C is corrected by anticoagulant cofactor activity found to be a property of factor V". Proceedings of the National Academy of Sciences. 91 (4): 1396–1400. Bibcode:1994PNAS...91.1396D. doi:10.1073/pnas.91.4.1396. PMC 43165. PMID 8108421.
- Zöller, B.; Dahlbäck, B. (1994). "Linkage between inherited resistance to activated protein C and factor V gene mutation in venous thrombosis". The Lancet. 343 (8912): 1536–1538. doi:10.1016/S0140-6736(94)92940-8. PMID 7911873. S2CID 34764295.
- Shen, L.; Dahlbäck, B. (1994). "Factor V and protein S as synergistic cofactors to activated protein C in degradation of factor VIIIa". Journal of Biological Chemistry. 269 (29): 18735–18738. doi:10.1016/S0021-9258(17)32228-7. PMID 8034625.
- Dahlbäck, Björn (1995). "The protein C anticoagulant system: Inherited defects as basis for venous thrombosis". Thrombosis Research. 77 (1): 1–43. doi:10.1016/0049-3848(94)00138-4. PMID 7701473.
- Lane, David A.; Mannucci, Pier M.; Bauer, Kenneth A.; Bertina, Rogier M.; Bochkov, Nikolay P.; Boulyjenkov, Victor; Chandy, Mammen; Dahlbäck, Björn; Ginter, E. K.; Miletich, Joseph P.; Rosendaal, Frits R.; Seligsohn, Uri (1996). "Inherited Thrombophilia*: Part 2". Thrombosis and Haemostasis. 76 (6): 0824–0834. doi:10.1055/s-0038-1650673. S2CID 15544852.
- Lindqvist, P.; Dahlbäck, B.; Marŝál, K. (1999). "Thrombotic risk during pregnancy: A population study". Obstetrics & Gynecology. 94 (4): 595–599. doi:10.1016/S0029-7844(99)00308-7. PMID 10511366.
- Xu, Ning; Dahlbäck, Björn (1999). "A Novel Human Apolipoprotein (ApoM)". Journal of Biological Chemistry. 274 (44): 31286–31290. doi:10.1074/jbc.274.44.31286. PMID 10531326.
- Dahlbäck, Björn (2000). "Blood coagulation". The Lancet. 355 (9215): 1627–1632. doi:10.1016/S0140-6736(00)02225-X. PMID 10821379. S2CID 31246121.
- Angelillo-Scherrer, Anne; De Frutos, Pablo Garcia; Aparicio, Cristina; Melis, Els; Savi, Pierre; Lupu, Florea; Arnout, Jef; Dewerchin, Mieke; Hoylaerts, Marc F.; Herbert, Jean-Marc; Collen, Désiré; Dahlbäck, Björn; Carmeliet, Peter (2001). "Deficiency or inhibition of Gas6 causes platelet dysfunction and protects mice against thrombosis". Nature Medicine. 7 (2): 215–221. doi:10.1038/84667. PMID 11175853. S2CID 10502090.
- Nicolaes, Gerry A.F.; DahlbäCk, Björn (2002). "Factor V and Thrombotic Disease". Arteriosclerosis, Thrombosis, and Vascular Biology. 22 (4): 530–538. doi:10.1161/01.ATV.0000012665.51263.B7. PMID 11950687. S2CID 13215200.
- Blom, Anna M.; Villoutreix, Bruno O.; Dahlbäck, Björn (2004). "Complement inhibitor C4b-binding protein—friend or foe in the innate immune system?". Molecular Immunology. 40 (18): 1333–1346. doi:10.1016/j.molimm.2003.12.002. PMID 15072852.
- Dahlbäck, Björn; Villoutreix, Bruno O. (2005). "The anticoagulant protein C pathway". FEBS Letters. 579 (15): 3310–3316. doi:10.1016/j.febslet.2005.03.001. PMID 15943976. S2CID 38782845.
- Hafizi, Sassan; Dahlbäck, Björn (2006). "Gas6 and protein S". FEBS Journal. 273 (23): 5231–5244. doi:10.1111/j.1742-4658.2006.05529.X. PMID 17064312. S2CID 13383158.
- Dahlbäck, Björn (2008). "Advances in understanding pathogenic mechanisms of thrombophilic disorders". Blood. 112 (1): 19–27. doi:10.1182/blood-2008-01-077909. PMID 18574041.
- Dahlbäck, Björn (2000). "Blood coagulation". The Lancet. 355 (9215): 1627–1632. doi:10.1016/S0140-6736(00)02225-X. PMID 10821379. S2CID 31246121.
- Christoffersen, C.; Obinata, H.; Kumaraswamy, S. B.; Galvani, S.; Ahnstrom, J.; Sevvana, M.; Egerer-Sieber, C.; Muller, Y. A.; Hla, T.; Nielsen, L. B.; Dahlback, B. (2011). "Endothelium-protective sphingosine-1-phosphate provided by HDL-associated apolipoprotein M". Proceedings of the National Academy of Sciences. 108 (23): 9613–9618. Bibcode:2011PNAS..108.9613C. doi:10.1073/pnas.1103187108. PMC 3111292. PMID 21606363.
