= OHP =

OHP may refer to:

- Haute-Provence Observatory (French: Observatoire de Haute-Provence), an astronomical observatory in the southeast of France
- Occupational health psychology, an interdisciplinary area of psychology that is concerned with the health and safety of workers
- Oklahoma Highway Patrol, a major state law enforcement agency of the government of Oklahoma
- Open House Party, an American radio show hosted on Saturday and Sunday nights by Kannon
- Open Humanities Press, an international open access publishing initiative in the humanities
- Order of the Holy Paraclete, an Anglican religious community
- Oregon Health Plan, Oregon's state Medicaid program
- Overall hemostatic potential, a global test of coagulation and fibrinolysis
- Overhead press, a weight training exercise with many variations
- Overhead projector, a device that uses light to project an enlarged image on a screen
- Oliver Hazard Perry-class Frigate, a class of guided missile frigates that were designed by US in mid-70s.
