= Renal vein thrombosis =

- Other names: Blood clot in the renal vein
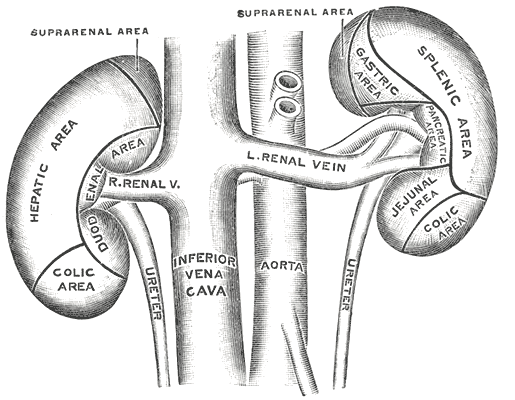
- The anterior surfaces of the kidneys, showing the areas of contact of neighboring viscera.
- Specialty: Nephrology

Renal vein thrombosis (RVT) is the formation of a clot in the vein that drains blood from the kidneys, ultimately leading to a reduction in the drainage of one or both kidneys and the possible migration of the clot to other parts of the body. First described by German pathologist Friedrich Daniel von Recklinghausen in 1861, RVT most commonly affects two subpopulations: newly born infants with blood clotting abnormalities or dehydration and adults with nephrotic syndrome.

Nephrotic syndrome, a kidney disorder, causes excessive loss of protein in the urine, low levels of albumin in the blood, a high level of cholesterol in the blood and swelling, triggering a hypercoagulable state and increasing chances of clot formation. Other less common causes include hypercoagulable state, cancer, kidney transplantation, Behcet syndrome, antiphospholipid antibody syndrome or blunt trauma to the back or abdomen.

Treatment of RVT mainly focuses on preventing further blood clots in the kidneys and maintaining stable kidney function. The use of anticoagulants has become the standard treatment in treating this abnormality. Membranous glomerulonephritis, the most common cause for nephrotic syndrome in adults, peaks in people ages 40–60 years old and it is twice as likely to occur in men than in women. Since nephrotic syndrome is the most common cause of RVT, people over 40 years old and men are most at risk to develop a renal vein thrombosis.

== Signs and symptoms ==
Aside from the occasional flank or lower back pain caused by a sudden clot in the major veins to the kidneys, RVT produces few symptoms. Some patients may not display any symptoms while other patients may experience bloody urine, decrease in urine output, edema and worsening proteinuria. Usually the diagnoses of RVT is first made when a nephrotic syndrome patient experiences a pulmonary embolism or a sudden decrease in kidney function or kidney failure. These symptoms may vary in duration since a blood clot can resolve itself, but precautions should be taken to prevent the migration of the clot to other parts of the body. The most severe complication of RVT is a pulmonary embolism, caused by a clot, also called a thrombus, that originates from the renal vein or any other vein in the body and migrates to the pulmonary artery. A pulmonary embolism is a serious condition because; it can damage the lungs due to pulmonary hypertension and cause low blood oxygen, damaging other organs in the body. This condition can cause death if left untreated; about 30% percent of patients who have a pulmonary embolism will die, usually within one hour.

Infants and young children experiencing dehydration induced RVT, may experience dehydration symptoms (dry mouth, low urine output, loss of skin turgidity) as while as vomiting, nausea and fever, and the usual RVT symptoms like flank pain, blood in the urine, anaemia, edema, enlarged kidneys and kidney failure.

== Mechanism ==
The mechanism behind RVT is no different from other types of blood clots in other parts of the body. Rudolf Virchow, was the first to describe the physiological mechanism behind venous thrombosis (blood clots) using three related factors, known as Virchow's Triad; damage to the blood vessel (endothelial damage), decrease in blood flow (stasis) and increased coagulability of the blood (thrombophilia or hypercoagulability). it is possible for one of these factors alone to cause a blood clot, but in most cases, a combination or all of these factors induce the formation of a blood clot. Decreased urine output or kidney function may be the only observable symptoms caused by a blood clot renal vein. Other less common causes include hypercoagulable state, invasion by renal cell carcinoma, kidney transplantation, Behcet syndrome, antiphospholipid antibody syndrome or blunt trauma to the back or abdomen.

=== Vein tissue damage ===
Damage to the endothelial tissue of the vein can be caused by blunt damage, trauma during venography, a renal transplant, tumors, acute rejection, vasculitis or spontaneous micro-trauma to the endothelium due to homocystinuria. Cystathionine beta synthase deficiency, also known as homocystinuria, is an autosomal recessive inherited disorder in which the body is not able to process certain building blocks of proteins correctly due to a mutation to the CBS gene. This mutation causes the amino acid homocystine not to be used properly thus high levels build up in the blood, damaging the endothelial tissue and increasing the likelihood of RVT.

=== Decreased blood flow ===
The most common cause of RVT in infants is dehydration. Dehydration may be caused by reduction in both volume and circulatory blood volume due to water depleting abnormalities like diarrhea or vomiting. The decrease in blood volume due to dehydration will cause blood flow to be diverted away from the kidneys to other organs, resulting in slower blood flow to the kidneys, increasing chances of a blood clot occurrence. "RVT is known to occur in the absence of clinically obvious shock e.g. following neonatal distress and placement of central venous catheters." RVT can also be induced by post transplant distortion or physical distortion or compression of the renal vein, which depending on the shape distortion can affect the rate of flow through the vein.

=== Hypercoagulability ===
Hypercoagulability is an abnormality of the blood that increases the risk of the formation blood clots. Nephrotic syndrome patients have a higher risk of RVT development due to hypercoagulability caused by proteinuria. The increased loss of proteins in the urine caused by nephrotic syndrome results in lower osmotic pressure. Reduced osmotic pressure will trigger the liver to produce more proteins like fibrinogen and beta-thromboglobulin, which promote blood clotting. Other than nephrotic syndrome, there are many other factors that can promote hypercoagulability. Hypercoagulability can be promoted by increased platelet count, enhanced platelet aggregation, increased protein S count, and a decrease in coagulation inhibiters like antithrombin. Hypercoagulability can be inherited and/or acquired. Hyperhomocysteinemia, a condition known to promote clots, can be caused by a combination of genetic factors and vitamin B6, vitamin B12 and folic acid deficiency. Factor V Leiden and mutations of the prothrombin gene are the two most common genetic causes of hypercoagulability. About 5% of the general population have these heterozygous mutations and in the thrombophilic population, 45–63% have these mutations.

=== Membranous glomerulonephritis ===
The incidence of RVT in people with Nephrotic syndrome ranges from 5% to 65%. Nephrotic syndrome is caused by membranous glomerulonephritis, minimal change disease, and focal segmental glomerulosclerosis.

== Diagnosis ==
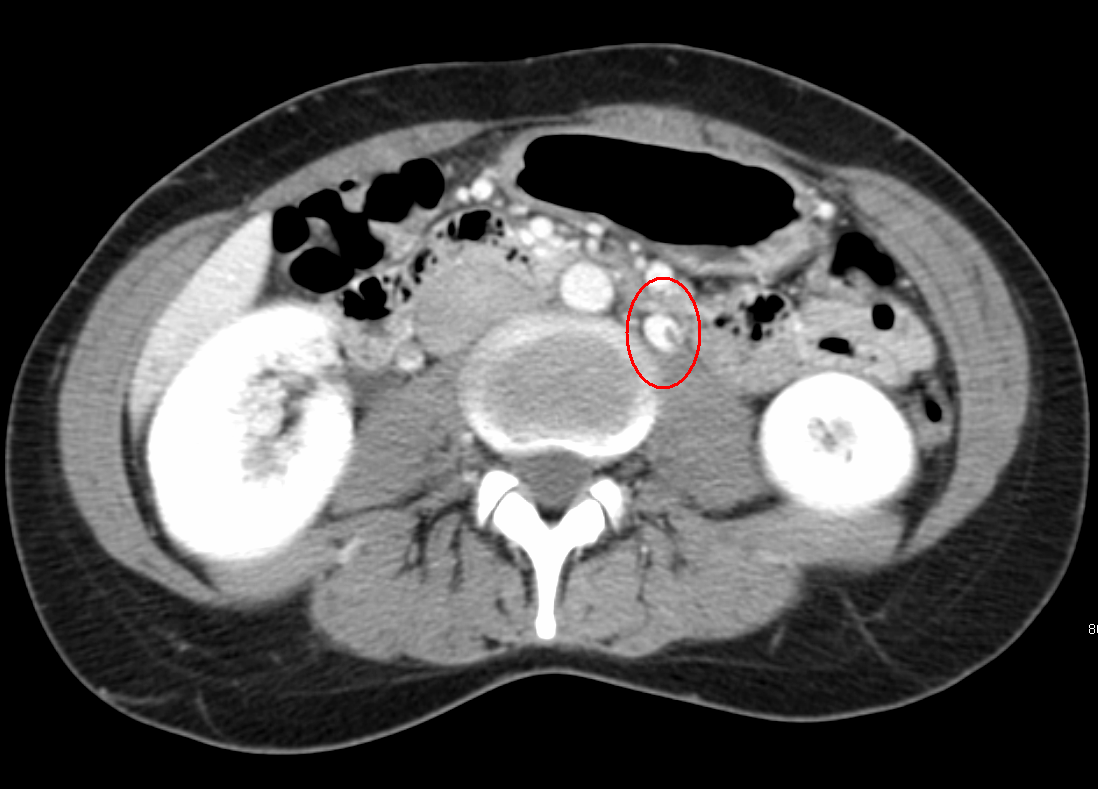
CT showing dilatation and thrombosis of the left renal vein in a patient with nutcracker syndrome

There are no laboratory tests used to diagnose RVT.

Observing the patient's symptoms, medical history and imaging remain the fundamental source for diagnosing RVT. Imaging is used to detect the presence of a blood clot. In an abnormal kidney with RVT, a blood clot is present in the renal vein. In cases where the renal vein is suddenly and/or fully blocked, the kidneys will enlarge, reaching its maximum size within a week. An ultrasound imaging can be used to observe and track the size of the kidneys in RVT patients. Ultrasound is not efficient for use in detecting blood flow in the renal veins and artery. Instead a color doppler ultrasound may be used to detect renal blood flow. It is most commonly used to detect RVT in patients who have undergone renal transplantation. CT angiography is currently the top choice in diagnosing RVT. It is non-invasive, relatively cheap and fast with high accuracy. CT scanning can be used to detect renal enlargement, renal tumors, blood flow and other renal pathologies. An alternative is magnetic resonance angiography or MRA. It is non-invasive, fast and avoids radiation (unlike a CT scan) but it is relatively expensive. MRA produces detailed images of the renal blood flow, vesicle walls, the kidneys and any surrounding tissue. An inferior venocavography with selective venography can be used to rule out the diagnoses of RVT.

== Treatment ==
Surgery to remove the clot is possible, but rarely performed. In the past, surgical removal of the renal vein clot was the primary treatment but it is very invasive and many complications can occur. In the past decades, treatment has shifted its focus from surgical intervention to medical treatments that include intravenous and oral anticoagulants. The use of anticoagulants may improve kidney function in RVT cases by removing the clot in the vein and preventing further clots from occurring. Patients who already have nephrotic syndrome may not need to take anticoagulants. In this case, patients should keep an eye out and maintain reduced level of proteinuria by reducing salt and excess protein, and intaking diuretics and statins. Depending on the severity of RVT, patients may be on anticoagulants from a year up to a lifetime. As long as the albumin levels in the bloodstream are below 2.5g/L, it is recommended that RVT patients continue taking anticoagulants. Main anticoagulants that can be used to treat RVT include warfarin and low molecular weight heparin. Heparin has become very popular, because of its low risk of complications, its availability and because it can easily be administered. Warfarin is known to interact with many other drugs, so careful monitoring is required. If a nephrotic syndrome patient experiences any of the RVT symptoms (flank or back pain, blood in the urine or decreased kidney function), he or she should immediately see a doctor to avoid further complications.

The main side effect of anticoagulants is the risk of excessive bleeding. Other side effects include: blood in the urine or feces, severe bruising, prolonged nosebleeds (lasting longer than 10 minutes), bleeding gum, blood in your vomit or coughing up blood, unusual headaches, sudden severe back pain, difficulty breathing or chest pain, in women, heavy or increased bleeding during the period, or any other bleeding from the vagina. Warfarin can cause rashes, diarrhea, nausea (feeling sick) or vomiting, and hair loss. Heparin can cause hair loss (alopecia) thrombocytopenia – a sudden drop in the number of platelets in the blood.

It has been reported in a case study of 27 patients with nephrotic syndrome caused RVT, there was a 40% mortality rate, mostly due to hemorrhagic complications and sepsis. In 75% of the remaining surviving patients, the RVT was resolved and kidney function returned to normal. It has been concluded that age is not a factor on the survival of RVT patients, although older patient (55 and older) are more likely to develop kidney failure. Heparin is crucial in returning normal kidney function; in patients that did not take heparin, long term kidney damage was observed in 100%. In patients that did take heparin, kidney damage was observed in about 33%. By quickly treating, and receiving the correct medications, patients should increase their chances of survival and reduce the risk of the renal vein clot from migrating to another part of the body.

== Research ==
It is known that diabetes causes changes to factors associated with coagulation and clotting, however not much is known of the risk of thromboembolism, or clots, in diabetic patients. There are some studies that show that diabetes increases the risk of thromboembolism; other studies show that diabetes does not increase the risk of thromboembolism. A study conducted in the Umeå University Hospital, in Sweden, observed patients that were hospitalized due to a thromboembolism from 1997 to 1999. The researchers had access to patient information including age, sex, vein thromboembolism diagnosis, diagnostic methods, diabetes type and medical history. This study concluded that there is, in fact, an increased risk of thromboembolism development in diabetic patients, possibly due to factors associated with diabetes or diabetes itself. Diabetic patients are twice as likely to develop a thromboembolism than are non-diabetic patient. The exact mechanism of how diabetes increases the risk of clot formation remains unclear and could possibly be a future direction for study.

From previous studies, it is known that long-distance air travel is associated with high risk of venous thrombosis. Long periods of inactivity in a limited amount of space may be a reason for the increased risk of blood clot formation. In addition, bent knees compresses the vein behind the knee (the popliteal vein) and the low humidity, low oxygen, high cabin pressure and consumption of alcohol concentrate the blood. A recent study, published in the British Journal of Haematology in 2014, determined which groups of people, are most at risk for developing a clot during or after a long flight. The study focused on 8755 frequent flying employees from international companies and organizations. It found that travelers who have recently undergone a surgical procedure or who have a malignant disease such as cancer or who are pregnant are most at risk. Preventative measures before flying may be taken in these at-risk groups as a solution.

Patients who have undergone kidney transplant have a high risk of developing RVT (about 0.4% to 6%). RVT is known to account for a large proportion of transplanted kidney failures due to technical problems (damage to the renal vein), clotting disorders, diabetes, consumption of ciclosporin or an unknown problem. Patients who have undergone a kidney transplant are commonly prescribed ciclosporin, an immunosuppressant drug which is known to reduce renal blood flow, increase platelet aggregation in the blood and cause damage to the endothelial tissue of the veins. In a clinical study conducted by the Nuffield Department of Surgery at the Oxford Transplant Centre, UK, transplant patients were given low doses of aspirin, which has some anti-platelet activity. There is risk of bleeding in transplant patients when using anticoagulants like warfarin and herapin. Low dosage of aspirin was used as an alternative. The study concluded that a routine low-dose of aspirin in kidney transplant patients who are also taking ciclosporin significantly reduces the risk of RVT development.

== See also ==
- Nephrotic syndrome
