= Angiology (journal) =

- Discipline: Health Sciences
- Language: English
- Edited by: Dimitri P. Mikhailidis

Publication details
- Former name: Vascular Diseases
- History: 1964-present
- Publisher: SAGE Publications (United Kingdom)
- Frequency: 8/year
- Impact factor: 2.931 (2015)

Standard abbreviations
- ISO 4: Angiology

Indexing
- CODEN: ANGIAB
- ISSN: 0003-3197 (print); 1940-1574 (web)
- LCCN: 64009372
- OCLC no.: 1481144

Links
- Journal homepage; Online access; Online archive

Angiology is a peer-reviewed academic journal that publishes papers in the field of Vascular disease. The journal's editor is Dimitri P. Mikhailidis. It has been in publication since 1950 and is currently published by SAGE Publications.

== Scope ==
Angiology aims to publish papers and case reports relative to all phases of all vascular diseases. The journal covers areas such as diagnostic methods, therapeutic approaches, and clinical and laboratory research and also publishes special issues and supplements relating to specific topics of current interest to surgeons and internists.

== Abstracting and indexing ==
Angiology is abstracted and indexed in, among other databases: SCOPUS, and the Social Sciences Citation Index. This journal's impact factor as of 2025 is 2.2 and the 5-year impact factor is 2.6. The acceptance rate is 21.3% and the first decision upon submission of an article is on average 10 days.
