= SFJ =

SFJ may refer to:

- Saphenofemoral junction, an anatomical structure in the groin
- StarFlyer (ICAO airline code)
- Kangerlussuaq Airport (IATA airport code)
- Super Formula Japan, a Japanese car-racing championship
- Sikhs for Justice, a pro-Khalistan (Sikh separatist) group based in the US
- Sydfyenske Jernbaner, a former Danish railway company
