= Johan Stenflo =

Swedish chemist and teacher (born 1940)

Johan Stenflo (born 1940) is a Swedish chemist and teacher. He received his M.D. in 1968 and his Ph.D. in 1973 at Lund University, where he later became a professor of clinical chemistry. In 1985, he became a member of the Royal Swedish Academy of Sciences. He is also a member of the Norwegian Academy of Science and Letters. In 1975, he published a classic paper on the biosynthesis of prothrombin.

His doctoral students include Björn Dahlbäck.
