= Henri Mondor =

French surgeon and literary historian

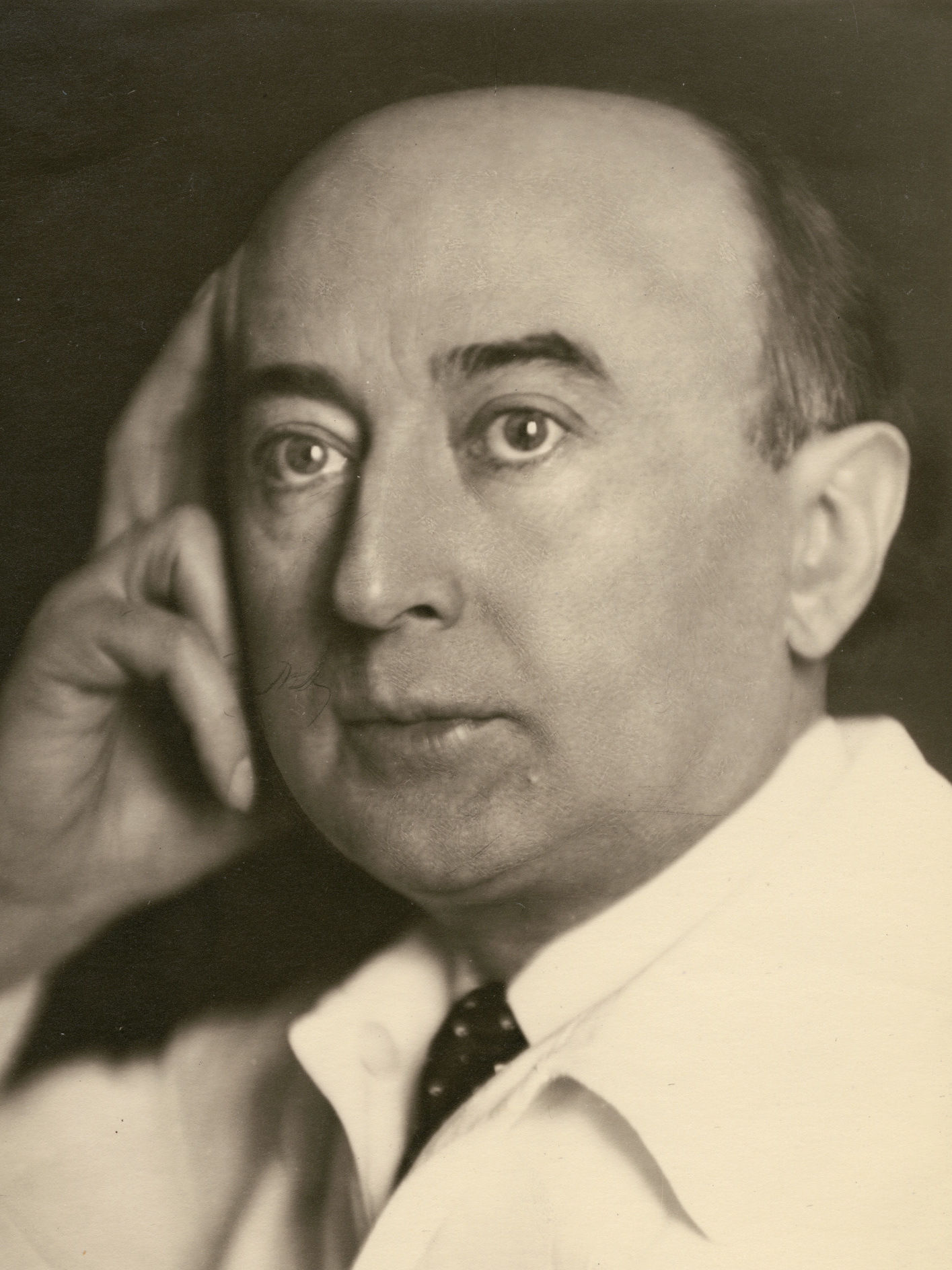
Henri Mondor

Henri Mondor (20 May 1885, Saint-Cernin, Cantal – 6 April 1962) was a French physician, surgeon, professor of clinical surgery, writer and historian of French literature and medicine.

Mondor was a professor of clinical surgery in Paris and became a member of the French Académie Nationale de Médecine in 1945, The Académie française in 1946 and the Académie des sciences in 1961. He is known for his studies of rectal cancer and urgent diagnosis. Also, Mondor's disease, a thrombophlebitis of the superficial veins of the breast and anterior chest wall, is named in his honour.
