= OFP =

OFP can refer to:

- One Fiji Party, political party in Fiji founded in 2014
- Operation Flashpoint (series), a video game franchise
- Operation Flashpoint: Cold War Crisis, a 2001 Czech video game
- Operational Flight Program (military aviation)
- Operational flight plan (civil aviation)
- Overall fibrinolytic potential, a parameter of the overall hemostatic potential test
- Overall Future Potential, a scouting assessment used in baseball to rank young players' potential in the major leagues
