= Activated protein C resistance =

Activated protein C resistance (APCR)
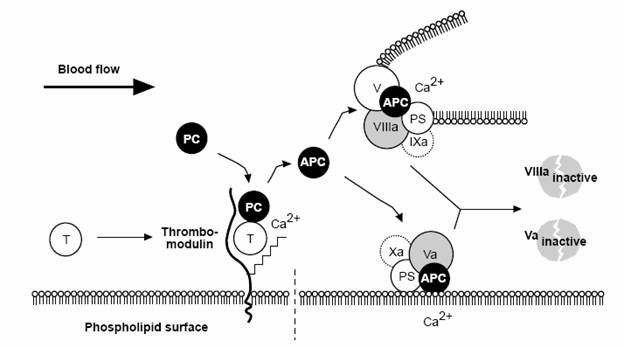
- Protein C Anticoagulant Pathway: Thrombin escaping from a site of vascular injury binds to its receptor thrombomodulin (TM) on the intact cell surface. As a result, thrombin loses its procoagulant properties and instead becomes a potent activator of protein C. Activated protein C (APC) functions as a circulating anticoagulant, which specifically degrades and inactivates the phospholipid-bound factors Va and VIIIa. This effectively down-regulates the coagulation cascade and limits clot formation to sites of vascular injury. T = Thrombin, PC= Protein C, Activated Protein C= APC, PS= Protein S
- Specialty: Hematology

Activated protein C resistance (APCR) is a hypercoagulability (an increased tendency of the blood to clot) characterized by a lack of a response to activated protein C (APC), which normally helps prevent blood from clotting excessively. This results in an increased risk of venous thrombosis (blood clots in veins), which resulting in medical conditions such as deep vein thrombosis (usually in the leg) and pulmonary embolism (in the lung, which can cause death). The most common cause of hereditary APC resistance is factor V Leiden mutation.

== Presentation ==
=== Associated conditions ===
An estimated 64 percent of patients with venous thromboembolism may have APC resistance.

== Genetics ==
The disorder can be acquired or inherited, the hereditary form having an autosomal dominant inheritance pattern.

== Pathophysiology ==
APC (with protein S as a cofactor) degrades Factor Va and Factor VIIIa. APC resistance is the inability of protein C to cleave Factor Va and/or Factor VIIIa, which allows for longer duration of thrombin generation and may lead to a hypercoagulable state. This may be hereditary or acquired. The best known and most common hereditary form is Factor V Leiden, which is responsible for more than 95% of cases. Other genetic causes include Factor V Cambridge (VThr306) and the factor V HR2 haplotype (A4070G mutation). Acquired forms of APC resistance occur in the presence of elevated Factor VIII concentrations. Antiphospholipid antibodies, pregnancy, and certain forms of estrogen therapy, such as ethinylestradiol-containing birth control pills, have been found to produce acquired APC resistance.

== Diagnosis ==
APC resistance can be evaluated using an APC resistance test. There are two types of APC resistance tests with different properties: the activated partial thromboplastin (aPTT)-based test and the endogenous thrombin potential (ETP)-based test.

== Treatment ==
Asymptomatic individuals with APC resistance (e.g., heterozygous factor V Leiden) are not normally treated unless additional risk factors for thrombosis are also present. An example is surgery, in which perioperative short-term anticoagulation may be used. However, people with homozygous factor V Leiden, and people with heterozygous factor V Leiden who have an additional thrombophilic condition (e.g., antithrombin deficiency, protein C deficiency, or protein S deficiency), should be considered for lifelong oral anticoagulation therapy. People with APC resistance and initial DVT are treated with a standard anticoagulant regimen, for instance intravenous heparin therapy followed by oral anticoagulation.
