= Hyperprothrombinemia =

Hyperprothrombinemia is a state of high of prothrombin levels in the blood which leads to hypercoagulability. An example of a genetic cause includes the mutation prothrombin G20210A. Hyperprothrombinemia is a risk factor for venous thromboembolism.

== See also ==
- Blood coagulation
