= ST Genesia =

The ST Genesia is a fully automated commercial analyzer system for performing thrombin generation assays (TGAs) and hence for coagulation testing. It was developed by Diagnostica Stago and was introduced by the company in 2018.

Traditionally, TGAs has been conducted using partially automated methods like the calibrated automated thrombogram (CAT), which was introduced in 2003. However, the CAT is performed in a 96-well plate and requires specialized technologists to be performed. Consequently, it has seen low implementation in routine laboratories and has been more limited to research settings. Lack of standardization with the CAT has also led to difficulties in study-to-study comparisons in research. It has been said that the introduction of the ST Genesia system, which will allow TGAs to be performed more easily and also shows improved reproducibility compared to the CAT, should allow for more widespread adoption of TGAs in clinical laboratories.
