= Phlebothrombosis =

Blood clot in vein

Phlebothrombosis occurs when a blood clot (thrombosis) in a vein (phlebo) forms independently from the presence of inflammation of the vein (phlebitis). Thrombophlebitis is phlebitis (vein inflammation) related to a thrombus (blood clot). These conditions are usually of the superficial veins and are generally mild and uncomplicated as opposed to deep vein thromboses, which can be life-threatening.
