= Cerastocytin =

Cerastocytin is a thrombin-like serine protease in snake venom.

== Function overview ==
Snake venom contains toxins capable of causing death to the reptile's prey in many various ways. Most of the toxins fall into one of the two categories: elapid (mainly neurotoxic) or viperid (mainly hemotoxic) toxins depending on the immediate cause of death. Elapid snakes cause prey to die from asphyxiation because the dominating neurotoxins inhibit cholinesterase activity, thereby leading to paralysis of all muscles, including the diaphragm. The immediate cause of death after bites of viperid snakes is a sudden drop in blood pressure or stroke as the hemotoxins, mostly prevalent in this type of venom, induce either extensive coagulation or bleeding. While snakes are categorized in this manner, venom of either type may include a number of toxic enzymes involved in neurotoxicity, hemotoxicity, nutrient digestion and other functions necessary to make the prey available for consumption.

While all hemotoxins leading to clot formation induce platelet aggregation, they do so in various ways. For example, botrocetin, found in the venom of Bothrops jararaca, activates von Willebrand factor (vWF) by inducing it to bind to platelet glycoprotein Ib (GPIb) thereby providing the surface for initial platelet aggregation. In contrast, cerastocytin and cerastotin (from the venom of Cerastes cerastes), as well as thrombocytin (from Bothrops atrox) and many others, are serine proteases that function in a way very similar to thrombin. Like thrombin, these proteases are capable of inducing platelet aggregation, and some even fibrin clot formation, at nanomolar concentrations.

== Structural comparison to thrombin ==
Cerastocytin, like most other serine proteases, thrombin specifically, has three distinguishing features: the hydrophobic pocket, the positive surface and the catalytic triad. Additionally, the tertiary structure of cerastocytin is maintained by disulfide bridges similar to those formed in other serine proteases. This structural similarity results of cerastocytin's ability to clot platelets and hydrolyze fibrinogen at the concentration of 5 nM, closely mimics the activity of thrombin at 1nM. Cerastocytin is made of 256 amino acids.

=== Hydrophobic pocket ===
Cerastocytin contains a hydrophobic domain that binds fibrinopeptide A and in the 3-D confirmation looks very similar to the analogous region of alpha-thrombin. Despite these functional and structural similarities, cerastocytin possesses a distinct amino acid sequence Ile98, Val99, Tyr172, Trp215, which forms the hydrophobic pocket when combined with the 90-loop (Phe90 Val99). The peptides that serve this purpose in thrombin (Leu99, Ile174, Trp215) are known as the aryl binding site and appear to be conserved in many different species.

However, the variation in this sequence within the hydrophobic pocket of cerastocytin suggests that the precise amino acid composition is not relevant to fibrinogen binding ability of the protease, as long as there is a non-polar region to interact with the hydrophobic part of the substrate. On the other hand, the fact that Trp215 is the only residue conserved in thrombinsand cerastocytin suggests the great significance of this one position for fibrinogen cleavage. This is confirmed by the observations of thrombocytin, which lacks the Trp215 residue, participates in platelet aggregation, but not in fibrinogenolytic activity.

=== Positive surface ===
Just as with the hydrophobic pocket, the sequence of the positively charged surface of cerastocytin differs in its amino acid sequence from that of thrombin, however, the 3-D structure and functionality remain the same. In cerastocytin, the cationic surface is formed by the dominance of basic amino acids between residues Tyr67-Arg80: two Arg, one Lys, two His, and one Asp. Similarly in thrombin four Arg, one Lys, one His and two Glu occupy the same residue stretch, albeit of different sequence, between Arg67-Ile80. The positive loops formed by these sequences protrude from the globular structures of the proteases. Since this exosite was shown to be involved in the platelet aggregating activity of thrombin, a similar function could be proposed for this structure in cerastocytin.

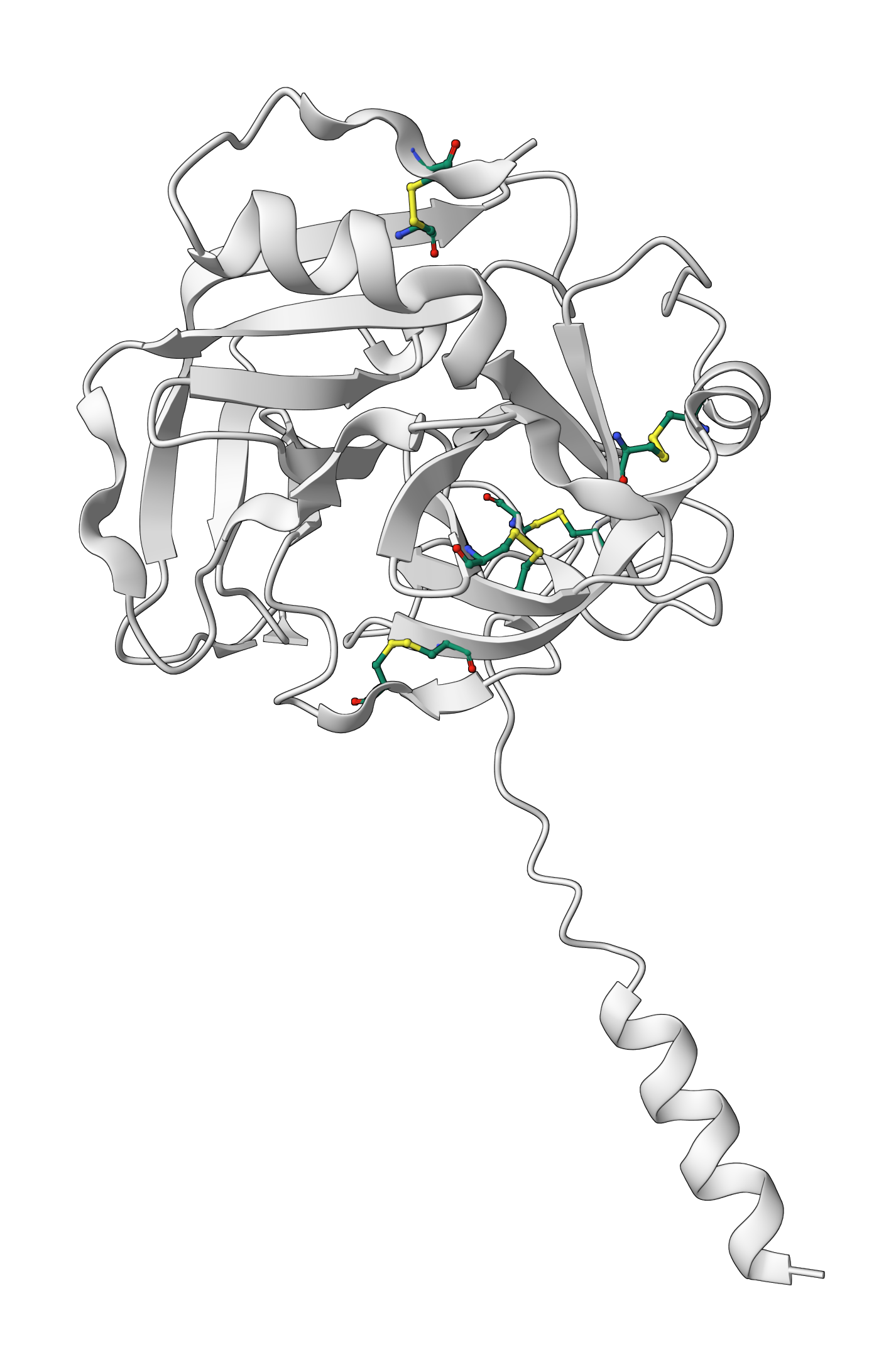
Ribbon diagram of cerastocytin showing five disulfide bonds. The typical thrombin disulfide bridge between Cys42 and Cys58 is absent, as noted in the article.

=== Catalytic triad ===
Unlike the hydrophobic pocket and the positively charged exosite, the catalytic triad sequence is precisely conserved in both thrombins from different species andcerastocytin: His57, Asp102, Ser195. This conformity once again emphasizes the importance of these residues for hydrolytic activity.

=== Disulfide bridges ===
The disulfide bridge between Cys42-Cys58 forms part of the fibrinogen recognition subsite S’ that is recognized as crucial for thrombin's ability to hydrolyze alpha- and beta-chains. Mutations within the S’ site have shown a decrease in the thrombin-facilitated fibrinogenolysis. However, the lack of a Cys, and therefore disulfide bridge in that region, in cerastocytin has no effect on fibrin clot formation or platelet aggregation.

== Comparison to some other venom proteases ==
Cerastotin is a more potent platelet proaggregant than cerastocytin because at a given amount it is just as active as an equal amount of crude venom. Pure cerastocytin, on the other hand, induces platelet aggregation six times slower than an equivalent volume of venom. However, while cerastotin is more kinetically favored than cerastocytin, it can only bind platelets in the presence of fibrinogen. Furthermore, its receptor binding site is not the same as that of thrombin. This is confirmed by the fact that cerastotin was still active after a thrombin desensitization test and was not affected by the competitive inhibitors of thrombin.

== Inhibition ==
The effects of various inhibitors are not always consistent for thrombin and cerastocytin. Just as with thrombin, cerastocytin-activated platelet aggregation is inhibited by chlorpromazine, theophylline and mepacrine. However, neither hirudin, nor antithrombin III have any effect on cerastocytin-mediated clot formation even though both have been observed to inhibit thrombin-facilitated platelet clot formation. This data suggests that cerastocytin has distinct sites for platelet and fibrinopeptide binding because the two functions could be inhibited independently of each other. Additionally, some antibodies (such as LJIblO) that have been observed to inhibit thrombin, interfered with cerastocytin activity, but not with cerastotytin. This data reinforces the concept that there are multiple toxins that are capable of producing similar physiological results via very different activation mechanisms.
