= Trousseau sign of malignancy =

- Differential diagnosis: thrombophlebitis migrans

The Trousseau sign of malignancy or Trousseau's syndrome is a medical sign involving episodes of vessel inflammation due to blood clot (thrombophlebitis) which are recurrent or appearing in different locations over time (thrombophlebitis migrans or migratory thrombophlebitis). The location of the clot is tender and the clot can be felt as a nodule under the skin. Trousseau's syndrome is a rare variant of venous thrombosis that is characterized by recurrent, migratory thrombosis in superficial veins and in uncommon sites, such as the chest wall and arms. This syndrome is particularly associated with pancreatic, gastric and lung cancer and Trousseau's syndrome can be an early sign of cancer sometimes appearing months to years before the tumor would be otherwise detected. Heparin therapy is recommended to prevent future clots. The Trousseau sign of malignancy should not be confused with the Trousseau sign of latent tetany caused by low levels of calcium in the blood.

== History ==
Armand Trousseau first described this finding in the 1860s; he later found the same sign in himself, was subsequently diagnosed with gastric cancer and died soon thereafter. Trousseau presciently attributed thromboembolism in malignancy to changes in blood composition rather than local inflammatory or mechanical forces. By correlating clinical observation with surgical and autopsy findings, Trousseau recognized that a localized cancer could induce a generalized hypercoagulable state in which thrombosis could occur elsewhere in the body, such as in extremities with visceral malignancy. Trousseau described several cases in which recurrent thrombosis was the presenting feature of visceral cancer, and his confidence in the utility of this connection led him to say, "So great, in my opinion, is the semiotic value of phlegmasia in the cancerous cachexia, that I regard this phlegmasia as a sign of the cancerous diathesis as certain as sanguinolent effusion into the serous cavities."

== Pathophysiology ==
Some malignancies, especially gliomas (25%), as well as adenocarcinomas of the pancreas and lung, are associated with hypercoagulability (the tendency to form blood clots) for reasons that are incompletely understood, but may be related to factors secreted by the tumors, in particular a circulating pool of cell-derived tissue factor-containing microvesicles. Some adenocarcinomas secrete mucin that can interact with selectin found on platelets, thereby causing small clots to form. Moreover, most malignant tumors overexpress and secrete heparanase, an enzyme that degrade heparan sulfate and endogenous heparin, and thus contribute to the hypercoagulable state in cancer patients.

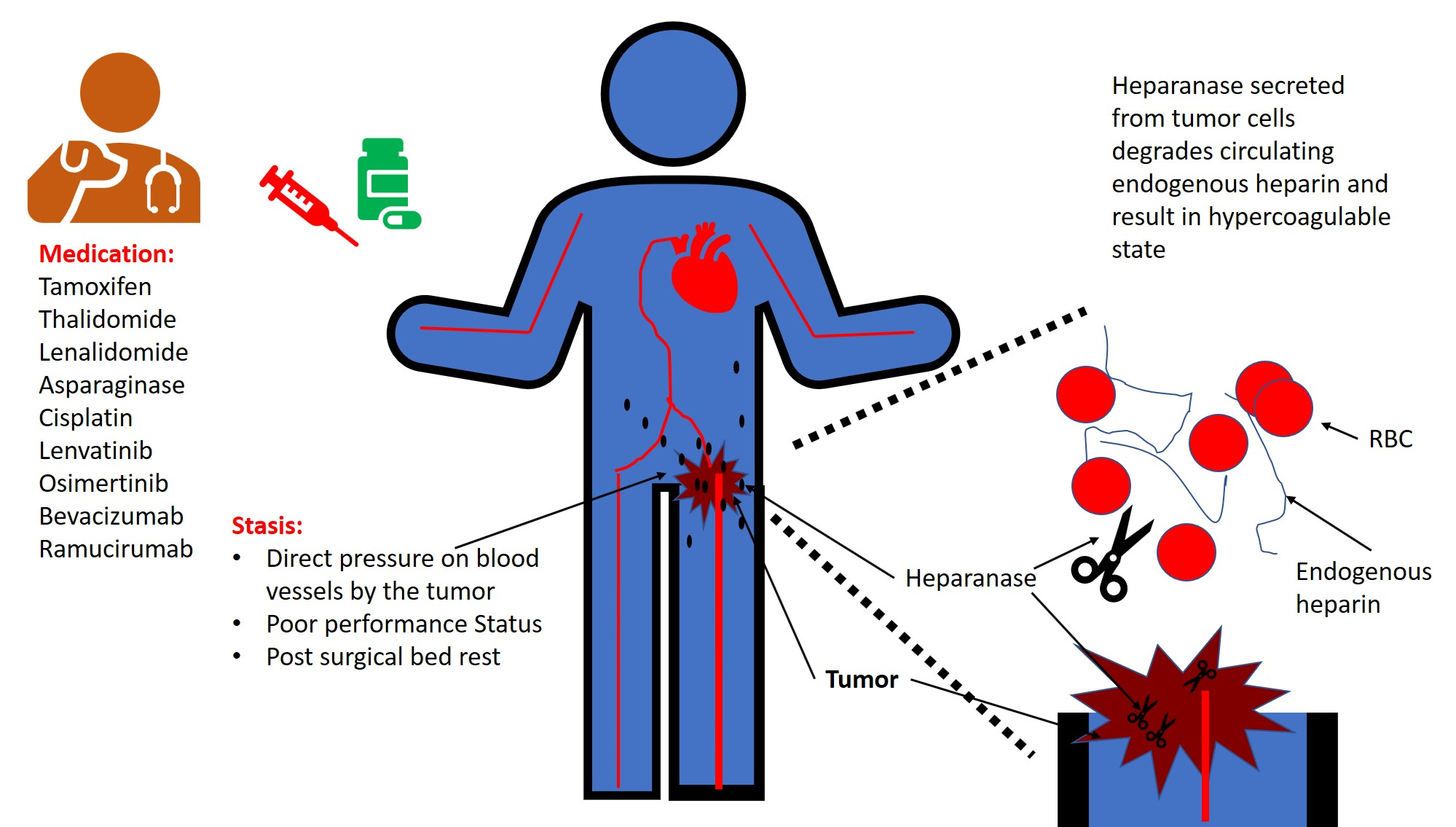
Potential Mechanisms of Cancer-Related Hypercoagulability: Cancer-associated thrombosis can result from: (1) stasis, i.e., direct pressure on blood vessels by the tumor mass, poor performance status, and bed rest following surgical procedures; (2) iatrogenic, due to treatment with antineoplastic medications; and (3) secretion of heparanase from malignant tumors that results in degradation of endogenous heparin. Nasser NJ, Fox J, Agbarya A. Cancers (Basel). 2020 Feb 29;12(3):566. https://doi.org/10.3390/cancers12030566

In patients with malignancy-associated hypercoagulable states, the blood may spontaneously form clots in the portal vessels (portal vein thrombosis), the deep veins of the limbs (deep vein thrombosis), or the superficial veins (superficial vein thrombosis) anywhere on the body. These clots present as visibly swollen blood vessels (thrombophlebitis), especially the veins, or as intermittent pain in the affected areas.
