= Overall hemostatic potential =

Test used to measure blood coagulation

- Synonyms: Overall hemostasis potential; Overall haemostasis potential; Overall haemostatic potential; OHP
- Test of: Coagulation, hypercoagulability, hypocoagulability, hemostasis, fibrinolysis

The overall hemostatic potential (OHP) test is a global coagulation assay which can be used to measure coagulation. The OHP assay measures total fibrin generation in the presence of thrombin or tissue factor and tissue plasminogen activator (t-PA). It generates a fibrin time curve through the use of optical density measurement. This curve represents the balance between fibrin formation induced by thrombin or tissue factor and fibrinolysis induced by t-PA. The assay provides three parameters: overall coagulation potential (OCP), overall hemostatic potential (OHP), and overall fibrinolytic potential (OFP). OHP is the main parameter, while OCP and OFP are supplementary parameters to assess coagulation and fibrinolysis. One further parameter, clot lysis time (CLT), can also be determined. The OHP assay measures the integrated effect of procoagulant, anticoagulant, and fibrinolytic factors.

The OHP is a technically simple but relatively labor-intensive assay. As of 2010, it had been implemented in several laboratories, but was not available commercially. The assay is novel in terms of its combined evaluation of both fibrin generation and fibrinolysis. The test is potentially useful in the evaluation of hypercoagulability, hypocoagulability, and fibrinolytic abnormalities. It is able to detect hypercoagulability associated with pregnancy and estrogen/progestogen hormone therapy. The test has also been used to study coagulation in feminizing hormone therapy in transgender women. However, more studies are needed to validate the test as a biomarker of thrombosis and other abnormalities of coagulation.

== History ==
The original OHP assay was developed in Sweden by Blombäck and colleagues and was first described in 1999. It used thrombin to trigger coagulation. Since then, a modified version has been developed which can use either thrombin or tissue factor to trigger coagulation.
