= Thrombin generation assay =

- Synonyms: TGA; Thrombin generation test; TGT
- Test of: Thrombin generation, coagulation, hypercoagulability

A thrombin generation assay (TGA) or thrombin generation test (TGT) is a global coagulation assay (GCA) and type of coagulation test which can be used to assess coagulation and thrombotic risk. It is based on the potential of a plasma to generate thrombin over time, following activation of coagulation via addition of phospholipids, tissue factor, and calcium. The results of the TGA can be output as a thrombogram or thrombin generation curve using computer software with calculation of thrombogram parameters.

TGAs can be performed with methods like the semi-automated calibrated automated thrombogram (CAT) (2003) or the fully automated ST Genesia system (2018). TGAs were first used as manual assays in the 1950s and have since become increasingly automated.

== Parameters ==
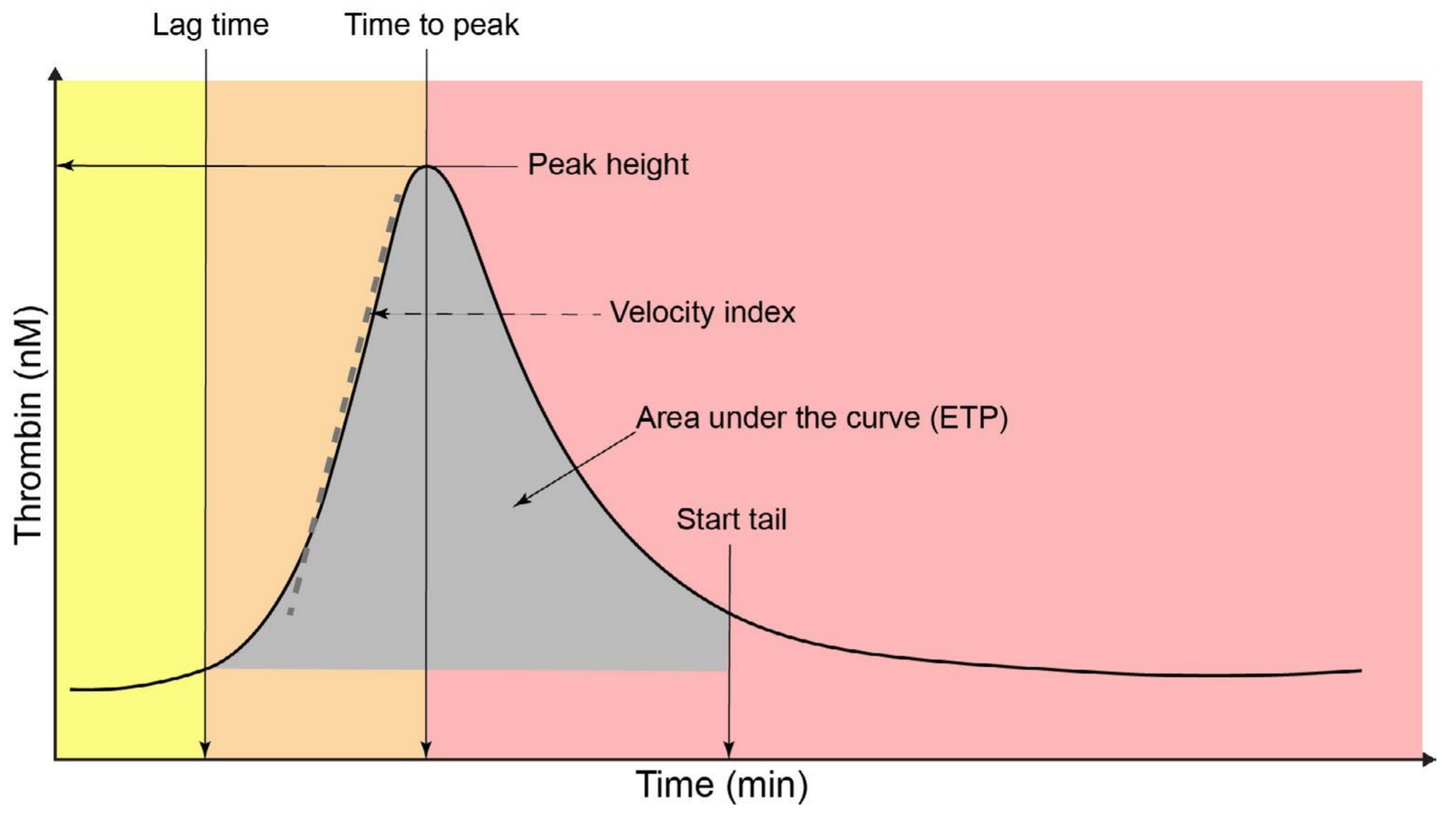
TGA thrombogram (thrombin generation curve) parameters. ETP is the endogenous thrombin potential or area under the curve.

Thrombogram parameters for the TGA include:

- Lag time (minutes; time until thrombin first generated/thrombin concentration first increased)
- Time to peak or ttPeak (minutes; time to maximum concentration of thrombin generated)
- Start tail (minutes; time at which thrombin generation ends and all generated thrombin has been inhibited)
- Peak height or peak thrombin (molar concentration (e.g., nM) of thrombin; peak or maximum concentration of thrombin generated)
- Velocity index (slope of thrombin generation between lag time/first thrombin generation and time to peak; corresponds to first derivative of this part of curve)
- Endogenous thrombin potential (ETP; area under the curve of the thrombin generation curve)

== ETP-based APC resistance test ==
The addition of activated protein C (APC) to a TGA results in an inhibition of thrombin generation as measured by reduction of the endogenous thrombin potential (ETP; area under the thrombin generation curve). This can be used to assess APC resistance and is termed the ETP-based APC resistance test. Results may be expressed as normalized APC sensitivity ratio (nAPCsr), which corresponds to the ratio of the ETP measured in the presence and absence of APC divided by the same ratio in reference plasma. The higher the nAPCsr value, the greater the APC resistance of the person. The ETP-based APC resistance test was developed in 1997.
