= Septic thrombophlebitis =

- Specialty: Infectious diseases

Septic thrombophlebitis is characterized by a bacterial or fungal infection that coexists with venous thrombosis. Deep veins or superficial veins could be affected. Septic thrombophlebitis can manifest as anything from a harmless condition that affects a small area of superficial veins to serious systemic infections that cause shock and even death.

== Signs and symptoms ==
Patients diagnosed with septic thrombophlebitis may exhibit a spectrum of symptoms, varying from moderate superficial vein swelling and pain to sepsis. This is contingent upon the duration and site of the infected thrombus. Patients who have peripheral vein involvement, which accounts for the majority of instances, may present with purulent leakage at the catheter insertion site, erythema and discomfort throughout the vein's course, and a fever greater than 100.4 F.

== Causes ==
Septic thrombophlebitis can occur following throat infections, dental procedures, gingivitis, or central lines. Following pregnancy septic pelvic thrombophlebitis may occur.

== Diagnosis ==
A contrast-enhanced computed tomography (CT) scan remains the best test currently available. The CT scan may also show any surrounding inflammation in addition to evaluating any filling deficiencies within a conduit that might hold a clot. The radiographic evidence of thrombosis is then used to make the diagnosis, along with the findings of blood cultures or cultures of purulent material collected from a suspicious site.

== Treatment ==
Treatment is mainly antibiotic and may involve heparin.

== See also ==
- Superficial thrombophlebitis
- List of cutaneous conditions
