= Prothrombin G20210A =

- Other names: Prothrombin thrombophilia, factor II mutation, prothrombin mutation, rs1799963, factor II G20210A
- Symptoms: Blood clots
- Frequency: 2% (Caucasians)

Prothrombin G20210A is a genetic variation associated with increased blood coagulation (thrombophilia). It increases the risk of blood clots including from deep vein thrombosis, and of pulmonary embolism. One copy of the mutation increases the risk of a blood clot from 1 in 1,000 per year to 2.5 in 1,000. Two copies increases the risk to up to 20 in 1,000 per year. Most people never develop a blood clot in their lifetimes.

It is due to a specific gene mutation in which a guanine is changed to an adenine at position 20210 of the DNA of the prothrombin gene. Other blood clotting pathway mutations that increase the risk of clots include factor V Leiden.

Prothrombin G20210A was identified in the 1990s. About 2% of Caucasians carry the variant, while it is less common in other populations. It is estimated to have originated in Caucasians about 24,000 years ago.

== Signs and symptoms ==
The variant causes elevated plasma prothrombin levels (hyperprothrombinemia), possibly due to increased pre-mRNA stability. Prothrombin is the precursor to thrombin, which plays a key role in causing blood to clot (blood coagulation). G20210A can thus contribute to a state of hypercoagulability, but not particularly with arterial thrombosis. A 2006 meta-analysis showed only a 1.3-fold increased risk for coronary disease. Deficiencies in the anticoagulants Protein C and Protein S further increase the risk five- to tenfold. Behind non-O blood type and factor V Leiden, prothrombin G20210A is one of the most common genetic risk factors for venous thromboembolism. Increased production of prothrombin heightens the risk of blood clotting. Moreover, individuals who carry the mutation can pass it on to their offspring.

The mutation increases the risk of developing deep vein thrombosis, which can cause pain and swelling, and sometimes post-thrombotic syndrome, ulcers, or pulmonary embolism. Most individuals do not require treatment but do need to be cautious during periods when the possibility of blood clotting are increased; for example, during pregnancy, after surgery, or during long flights. Occasionally, blood-thinning medication may be indicated to reduce the risk of clotting.

A 2005 article concluded that heterozygous carriers who take combined birth control pills are at a 15-fold increased risk of venous thromboembolism, while carriers also heterozygous with factor V Leiden have an approximate 20-fold higher risk.A more recent and larger study in 2023, however, concluded that heterozygous carriers had a 5.23x-increased risk, and those with both factors a 6.35x risk. In a recommendation statement on venous thromboembolism, genetic testing for G20210A in adults that developed unprovoked venous thromboembolism (Note: Provoked venous thromboembolism is triggered by situations such as surgery, trauma, cancer, or immobility.) was not advised, as was testing in asymptomatic family members related to G20210A carriers who in whom venous thromboembolism occurred. In those who develop venous thromboembolism, the results of thrombophilia tests (wherein the variant can be detected) rarely play a role in the length of treatment.

== Cause ==
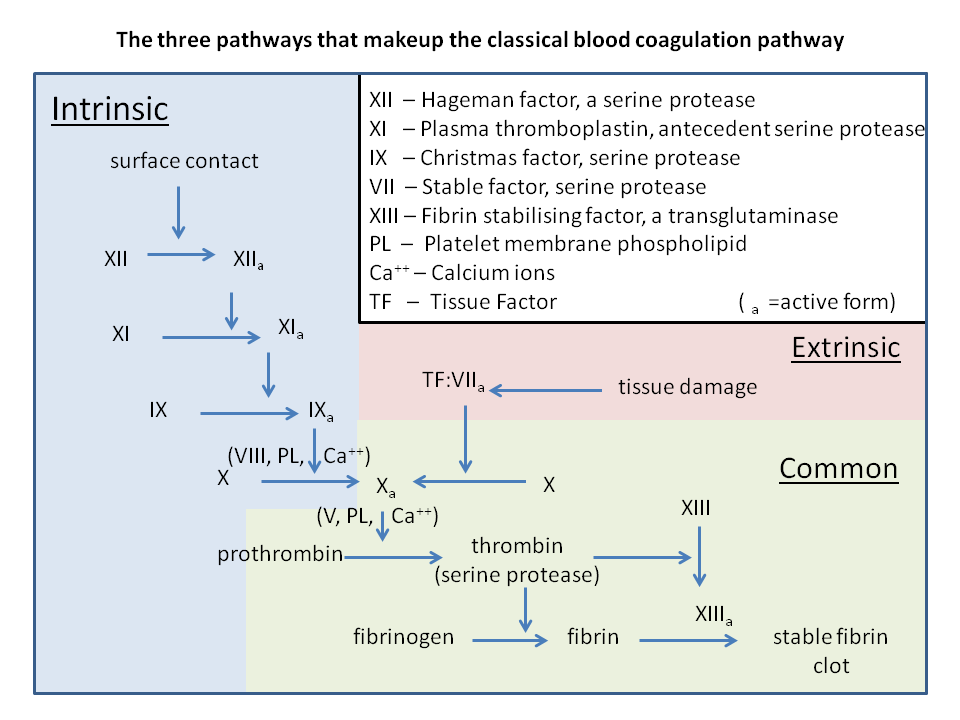
The classical blood coagulation pathway

SNP: rs1799963
- Gene: F2
- Chromosome: 11

External databases
- Ensembl: Human SNPView
- dbSNP: 1799963
- HapMap: 1799963
- SNPedia: 1799963

The polymorphism is located in a noncoding region of the prothrombin gene (3' untranslated region nucleotide 20210 (Note: Specifically, position 20210 refers to the nucleotide on the sense strand downstream from the DNA that codes for the start codon (ATG, positions 1 to 3).)), replacing guanine with adenine. The position is at or near where the pre-mRNA will have the poly-A tail attached.

== Diagnosis ==
Diagnosis of the prothrombin G20210A mutation is straightforward because the mutation involves a single base change (point mutation) that can be detected by genetic testing, which is unaffected by intercurrent illness or anticoagulant use.

Measurement of an elevated plasma prothrombin level cannot be used to screen for the prothrombin G20210A mutation, because there is too great of an overlap between the upper limit of normal and levels in affected patients.

== Treatment ==
Patients with the prothrombin mutation are treated similarly to those with other types of thrombophilia, with anticoagulation for at least three to six months. Continuing anticoagulation beyond three to six months depends on the circumstances surrounding thrombosis, for example, if the patient experiences a thromboembolic event that was unprovoked, continuing anticoagulation would be recommended. The choice of anticoagulant (warfarin versus a direct oral anticoagulant) is based on a number of different factors (the severity of thrombosis, patient preference, adherence to therapy, and potential drug and dietary interactions).

Patients with the prothrombin G20210A mutation who have not had a thromboembolic event are generally not treated with routine anticoagulation. However, counseling the patient is recommended in situations with increased thrombotic risk is recommended (pregnancy, surgery, and acute illness). Oral contraceptives should generally be avoided in women with the mutation as they increase the thrombotic risk. This is because the combination of genetic predisposition (high baseline prothrombin levels) and the additional pro-coagulant influence of oral contraceptives alters the hemostatic balance of fibrinolysis to trigger thrombosis.

== Terminology ==
Because prothrombin is also known as factor II, the mutation is also sometimes referred to as the factor II mutation or simply the prothrombin mutation; in either case, the names may appear with or without the accompanying G20210A location specifier (unhelpfully, since prothrombin mutations other than G20210A are known).
