= Coagulation testing =

- Purpose: tests used for diagnostics of the hemostasis system.

Blood clotting tests are the tests used for diagnostics of the hemostasis system. Coagulometer is the medical laboratory analyzer used for testing of the hemostasis system. Modern coagulometers realize different methods of activation and observation of development of blood clots in blood or in blood plasma.

== Classification of blood clotting tests ==
Substantially all coagulometers used in laboratory diagnostics are based on the methods of testing of the hemostasis system created more than fifty years ago. The majority of these methods are good to detect defects in one of the hemostasis components, without diagnosing other possible defects. Another problem of the actual hemostasis system diagnostics is the thrombosis prediction, i.e. sensitivity to the patient's prethrombotic state. All the diversity of clinical tests of the blood coagulation system can be divided into 2 groups: global (integral, general) tests, and «local» (specific) tests.

=== Global tests ===
Global tests, also known as global coagulation assays (GCAs), characterize the results of work of the whole clotting cascade. They suit to diagnose the general state of the blood coagulation system and the intensity of pathologies, and to simultaneously record all attendant influences. Global methods play the key role at the first stage of diagnostics: they provide an integral picture of alterations within the coagulation system and allow predicting a tendency to hyper- or hypo-coagulation in general.

=== Local tests ===
Local tests characterize the results of work of the separate components of the blood coagulation system cascade, as well as of the separate coagulation factors. They are essential for the possibility to specify the pathology localization within the accuracy of coagulation factor.

A D-dimer (product of thrombi degradation) test can be specified separately. The rise of D-dimers concentration in the patient's blood states the possibility of the completed thrombosis. To obtain a complete picture of the work of hemostasis by a patient, the doctor should have a possibility to choose which test is necessary.

According to the type of the investigated object, the following complementary groups of methods can be specified:

- Tests in platelet poor plasma or in platelet free plasma (convenient for transportation; can be frozen; possibility to use optical observation methods; but the thrombocyte component of the hemostasis is not taken into account),
- Tests in platelet rich plasma (close to real conditions in the body, but restrictions as to the terms of work),
- Tests in whole blood (the most adjusted to human physiology; the test can be started immediately; but the least convenient due to terms of blood storage and difficulties of the results' interpretation).

=== Specific global tests ===
- Thromboelastography (TEG)
  - Investigation of the whole blood
  - No information about the thrombin formation kinetics, low separability of plasma and thrombocyte hemostasis contribution
  - Non-standardized
  - Low sensitivity
- Thrombin generation assay (TGA) (thrombin potential, endogenous thrombin potential (ETP))
  - Possibility to use platelet poor plasma or platelet rich plasma
  - Information about the catalyst of the main reaction – transformation of fibrinogen into fibrin
  - Homogenous (activation in the whole sample volume)
- ETP-based activated protein C resistance test (ETP-based APCR)
- Thrombodynamics test
  - Non-homogenous: realization of the three-dimensional model of the clot growth
  - Use of platelet free plasma
  - Record of information about the clot formation as a diagram, giving the possibility to calculate the key parameters of the blood coagulation system
  - New test, not widely accepted
- Overall hemostatic potential (OHP)

=== Specific local tests ===
- Activated partial thromboplastin time (APTT or aPTT)
  - Characteristics of the velocity of passage of the intrinsic coagulation pathway
  - Poor plasma (the most convenient to work with, but no realization of the thrombocyte clotting mechanism)
  - Contact activation pathway
- Prothrombin time test (or prothrombin test, INR, PT) – velocity of passage of the extrinsic blood coagulation pathway
  - Poor plasma
  - Not sensitive to deficiency of intrinsic coagulation pathway factors
- Highly specialized methods to reveal the alteration in concentration of separate factors.
