= Saphenofemoral junction =

Anatomical structure in the groin

The sapheno-femoral junction (SFJ) is located at the saphenous opening within the groin and formed by the meeting of the great saphenous vein (GSV), common femoral vein and the superficial inguinal veins (confluens venosus subinguinalis). It is one of the distinctive points where a superficial vein meets a deep vein and at which incompetent valves may occur.

== Structure ==
The SFJ can be located in the groin crease, or in a 3 × 3 cm region situated up to 4 cm to the side and up to 3cm below to the pubic tubercle. It is nearer to the pubic tubercle in younger and thinner subjects.

The GSV has two valves near the SFJ. One is a terminal valve about 1-2mm from the opening into the femoral vein and the other is about 2cm away.
