= Thrombin =

Enzyme involved in blood coagulation in humans

F2
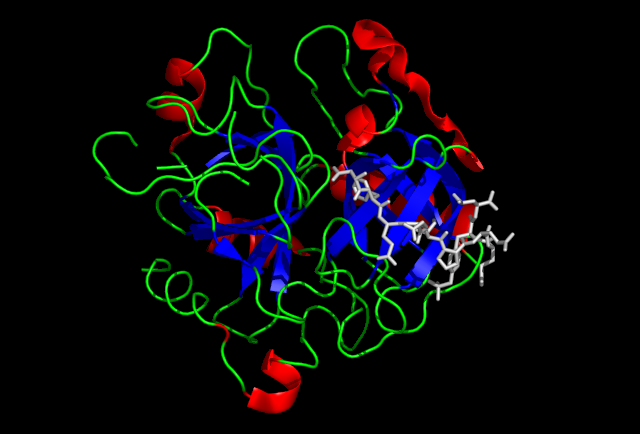

Identifiers
- Aliases: F2, PT, RPRGL2, THPH1, coagulation factor II, thrombin
- External IDs: OMIM: 176930; MGI: 88380; GeneCards: F2
Available structures
PDB	Ortholog search: PDBe RCSB
PDB	List of PDB id codes 1A2C, 1A3B, 1A3E, 1ABI, 1ABJ, 1AD8, 1AE8, 1AI8, 1AIX, 1AWF, 1AWH, 1AY6, 1B5G, 1B7X, 1BA8, 1BB0, 1BCU, 1BHX, 1BMM, 1BMN, 1BTH, 1C1U, 1C1V, 1C1W, 1C4U, 1C4V, 1C4Y, 1C5L, 1C5N, 1C5O, 1CA8, 1D3D, 1D3P, 1D3Q, 1D3T, 1D4P, 1D6W, 1D9I, 1DE7, 1DIT, 1DM4, 1DOJ, 1DWB, 1DWC, 1DWD, 1DX5, 1E0F, 1EB1, 1EOJ, 1EOL, 1FPC, 1G30, 1G32, 1G37, 1GHV, 1GHW, 1GHX, 1GHY, 1GJ4, 1GJ5, 1H8D, 1H8I, 1HAI, 1HAO, 1HAP, 1HBT, 1HLT, 1HUT, 1HXE, 1HXF, 1IHS, 1JMO, 1JOU, 1JWT, 1K21, 1K22, 1KTS, 1KTT, 1LHC, 1LHD, 1LHE, 1LHF, 1LHG, 1MH0, 1MU6, 1MU8, 1MUE, 1NM6, 1NRN, 1NRO, 1NRP, 1NRQ, 1NRR, 1NRS, 1NT1, 1NU7, 1NU9, 1NY2, 1NZQ, 1O0D, 1O2G, 1O5G, 1OOK, 1OYT, 1P8V, 1PPB, 1QBV, 1QHR, 1QJ1, 1QJ6, 1QJ7, 1QUR, 1RD3, 1RIW, 1SB1, 1SFQ, 1SG8, 1SGI, 1SHH, 1SL3, 1SR5, 1T4U, 1T4V, 1TA2, 1TA6, 1TB6, 1THP, 1THR, 1THS, 1TMB, 1TMU, 1TOM, 1TQ0, 1TQ7, 1TWX, 1UVS, 1VR1, 1VZQ, 1W7G, 1WAY, 1WBG, 1XM1, 1XMN, 1YPE, 1YPG, 1YPJ, 1YPK, 1YPL, 1YPM, 1Z71, 1Z8I, 1Z8J, 1ZGI, 1ZGV, 1ZRB, 2A0Q, 2A2X, 2A45, 2AFQ, 2ANK, 2ANM, 2B5T, 2BDY, 2BVR, 2BVS, 2BVX, 2BXT, 2BXU, 2C8Y, 2FEQ, 2FES, 2GDE, 2GP9, 2H9T, 2HGT, 2HNT, 2HPP, 2HPQ, 2HWL, 2JH0, 2JH6, 2OD3, 2PGB, 2PGQ, 2PW8, 2R2M, 2THF, 2ZFQ, 2ZFR, 2ZG0, 2ZHE, 2ZHF, 2ZHW, 2ZI2, 2ZIQ, 2ZNK, 2ZO3, 3B23, 3B9F, 3BEF, 3BEI, 3BF6, 3BIU, 3BIV, 3BV9, 3C1K, 3C27, 3D49, 3DA9, 3DD2, 3DT0, 3DUX, 3E6P, 3EE0, 3EQ0, 3F68, 3GIC, 3GIS, 3HAT, 3HKJ, 3HTC, 3JZ2, 3LDX, 3LU9, 3NXP, 3P17, 3P6Z, 3P70, 3PO1, 3QGN, 3QLP, 3QTO, 3QTV, 3QWC, 3QX5, 3R3G, 3RLW, 3RLY, 3RM0, 3RM2, 3RML, 3RMM, 3RMN, 3RMO, 3S7H, 3S7K, 3SHA, 3SHC, 3SI3, 3SI4, 3SQE, 3SQH, 3SV2, 3T5F, 3TU7, 3U69, 3U8O, 3U8R, 3U8T, 3U98, 3U9A, 3UTU, 3UWJ, 3VXE, 3VXF, 4BAH, 4BAK, 4BAM, 4BAN, 4BAO, 4BAQ, 4BOH, 4DIH, 4DII, 4DT7, 4DY7, 4E05, 4E06, 4E7R, 4H6S, 4H6T, 4HFP, 4HTC, 4THN, 5GDS, 7KME, 8KME, 1A46, 1A4W, 1A5G, 1A61, 1AFE, 1AHT, 1DWE, 1FPH, 1HAG, 1HAH, 1HDT, 1HGT, 1IHT, 1NO9, 1TBZ, 1TMT, 1UMA, 2C8W, 2C8X, 2C8Z, 2C90, 2C93, 2CF8, 2CF9, 2CN0, 2JH5, 2PKS, 2UUF, 2UUJ, 2UUK, 2V3H, 2V3O, 2ZC9, 2ZDA, 2ZDV, 2ZF0, 2ZFF, 2ZFP, 2ZGB, 2ZGX, 2ZHQ, 3DHK, 3EGK, 3JZ1, 3K65, 3PMH, 3QDZ, 4AX9, 4AYV, 4AYY, 4AZ2, 4CH2, 4CH8, 4HZH, 4I7Y, 4LOY, 4LXB, 4LZ1, 4LZ4, 4MLF, 4N3L, 4NZE, 4NZQ, 4O03, 4RKJ, 4RKO, 4RN6, 4YES, 4UD9, 4UDW, 4UE7, 4UEH, 5AF9, 5AFY, 5AFZ, 5AHG, 5CMX, 4UFD, 5EDM, 5E8E, 5EDK, 4UFE, 4UFG, 4UFF, 5A2M, 5JDU
Enzyme activity
EC #	BRENDA	ExPASy	KEGG	MetaCyc
3.4.21.5	↗	↗	↗	↗

Gene location (Human)
Chr.	Chromosome 11 (human)
Band	11p11.2	Start	46,719,196 bp
Band	11p11.2	End	46,739,506 bp

Gene location (Mouse)
Chr.	Chromosome 2 (mouse)
Band	2 E1|2 50.63 cM	Start	91,455,665 bp
Band	2 E1|2 50.63 cM	End	91,466,759 bp
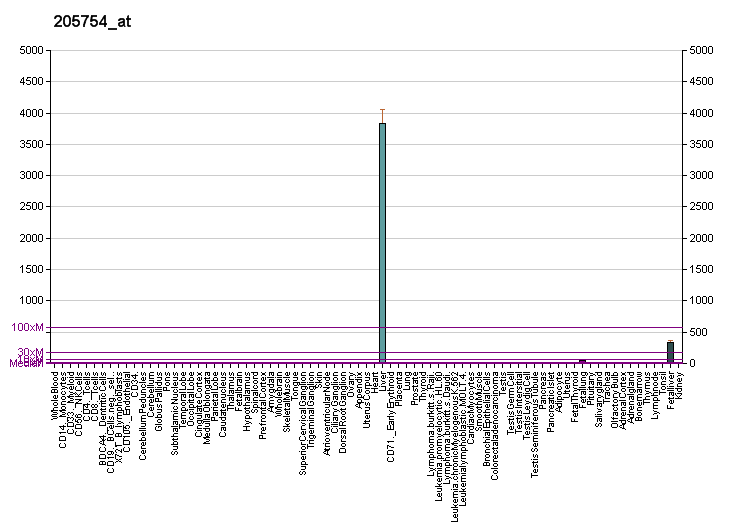
RNA expression pattern
Bgee	Human / Mouse (ortholog); Top expressed in: right lobe of liver; testicle; oocyte; secondary oocyte; cerebellar hemisphere; right hemisphere of cerebellum; popliteal artery; tibial arteries; fundus; embryo / Top expressed in: left lobe of liver; fetal liver hematopoietic progenitor cell; gallbladder; yolk sac; human fetus; sexually immature organism; morula; primary oocyte; secondary oocyte; zygote; More reference expression data
BioGPS	More reference expression data
Gene ontology
Molecular function	calcium ion binding; signaling receptor binding; peptidase activity; hydrolase activity; growth factor activity; serine-type peptidase activity; thrombospondin receptor activity; protein binding; serine-type endopeptidase activity; lipopolysaccharide binding; heparin binding; enzyme activator activity
Cellular component	extracellular exosome; blood microparticle; endoplasmic reticulum lumen; Golgi lumen; plasma membrane; extracellular region; extracellular space; external side of plasma membrane; collagen-containing extracellular matrix
Biological process	blood coagulation, intrinsic pathway; regulation of blood coagulation; positive regulation of phosphatidylinositol 3-kinase signaling; positive regulation of collagen biosynthetic process; multicellular organism development; peptidyl-glutamic acid carboxylation; acute-phase response; positive regulation of reactive oxygen species metabolic process; endoplasmic reticulum to Golgi vesicle-mediated transport; positive regulation of cell growth; cell surface receptor signaling pathway; regulation of gene expression; positive regulation of release of sequestered calcium ion into cytosol; positive regulation of cell population proliferation; leukocyte migration; negative regulation of fibrinolysis; positive regulation of blood coagulation; regulation of cytosolic calcium ion concentration; response to wounding; signal peptide processing; positive regulation of phospholipase C-activating G protein-coupled receptor signaling pathway; regulation of cell shape; hemostasis; negative regulation of proteolysis; negative regulation of platelet activation; negative regulation of astrocyte differentiation; positive regulation of protein phosphorylation; fibrinolysis; blood coagulation; proteolysis; platelet activation; positive regulation of protein localization to nucleus; positive regulation of lipid kinase activity; regulation of complement activation; antimicrobial humoral immune response mediated by antimicrobial peptide; negative regulation of cytokine production involved in inflammatory response; regulation of signaling receptor activity; G protein-coupled receptor signaling pathway; positive regulation of receptor signaling pathway via JAK-STAT; blood coagulation, fibrin clot formation
Sources:Amigo / QuickGO
Orthologs
Databases	NCBI: entry; OMA: entry
Species	Human	Mouse
Entrez	2147	14061
Ensembl	ENSG00000180210	ENSMUSG00000027249
UniProt	P00734	P19221
RefSeq (mRNA)	NM_000506; NM_001311257	NM_010168
RefSeq (protein)	NP_000497	NP_034298
Location (UCSC)	Chr 11: 46.72 – 46.74 Mb	Chr 2: 91.46 – 91.47 Mb
PubMed search
- Wikidata
View/Edit Human	View/Edit Mouse

Role of thrombin in the blood coagulation cascade

Thrombin (factor IIa, EC 3.4.21.5) is a serine protease that converts fibrinogen into strands of insoluble fibrin, as well as catalyzing many other coagulation-related reactions.

Prothrombin (coagulation factor II) is encoded in the human by the F2 gene. It is proteolytically cleaved during the clotting process by the prothrombinase enzyme complex to form thrombin.

== History ==
After the description of fibrinogen and fibrin, Alexander Schmidt hypothesised the existence of an enzyme that converts fibrinogen into fibrin in 1872.

Prothrombin was discovered by Pekelharing in 1894.

== Physiology ==
=== Synthesis ===
Thrombin is produced by the enzymatic cleavage of two sites on prothrombin by activated Factor X (Xa). The activity of factor Xa is greatly enhanced by binding to activated Factor V (Va), termed the prothrombinase complex. Prothrombin is produced in the liver and is co-translationally modified in a vitamin K-dependent reaction that converts 10-12 glutamic acids in the N terminus of the molecule to gamma-carboxyglutamic acid (Gla). In the presence of calcium, the Gla residues promote the binding of prothrombin to phospholipid bilayers. Deficiency of vitamin K or administration of the anticoagulant warfarin inhibits the production of gamma-carboxyglutamic acid residues, slowing the activation of the coagulation cascade.

In human adults, the normal blood level of antithrombin activity has been measured to be around 1.1 units/mL. Newborn levels of thrombin steadily increase after birth to reach normal adult levels, from a level of around 0.5 units/mL 1 day after birth, to a level of around 0.9 units/mL after 6 months of life.

=== Mechanism of action ===
Thrombin is an allosteric serine protease that is an essential effector of coagulation that is produced at sites of vascular injury and plays a critical role in cellular response to blood-related diseases. It binds to and cleaves the extracellular N-terminal domain of the receptor. A tethered ligand corresponding to the new N-terminus, SFLLRN, is then unmasked, binding to the second extracellular loop of the receptor and activating it.

In the blood coagulation pathway, thrombin acts to convert factor XI to XIa, VIII to VIIIa, V to Va, fibrinogen to fibrin, and XIII to XIIIa. In the conversion of fibrinogen into fibrin, thrombin catalyzes the cleavage of fibrinopeptides A and B from the respective Aα and Bβ chains of fibrinogen to form fibrin monomers. Factor XIIIa is a transglutaminase that catalyzes the formation of covalent bonds between lysine and glutamine residues in fibrin. The covalent bonds increase the stability of the fibrin clot. Thrombin interacts with thrombomodulin. As part of its activity in the coagulation cascade, thrombin also promotes platelet activation and aggregation via activation of protease-activated receptors on the cell membrane of the platelet.

=== Negative feedback ===
Thrombin bound to thrombomodulin activates protein C, an inhibitor of the coagulation cascade. The activation of protein C is greatly enhanced following the binding of thrombin to thrombomodulin, an integral membrane protein expressed by endothelial cells. Activated protein C inactivates factors Va and VIIIa. Binding of activated protein C to protein S leads to a modest increase in its activity. Thrombin is also inactivated by antithrombin, a serine protease inhibitor.

== Structure ==
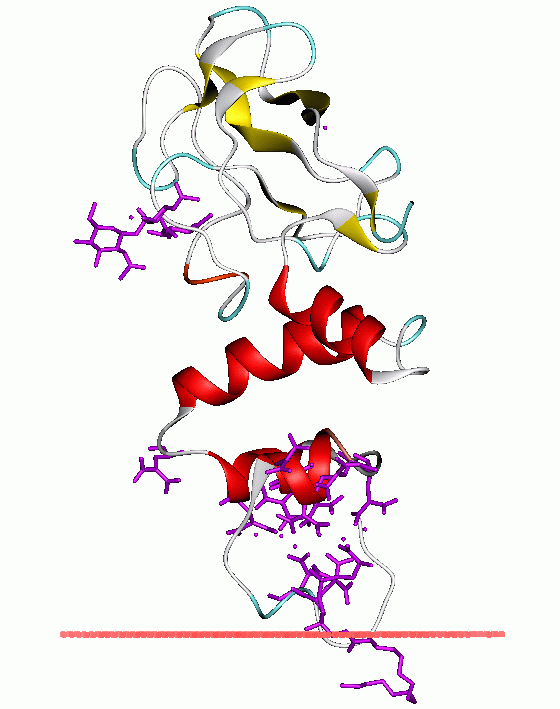
Anchoring of bovine prothrombin to the membrane through its Gla domain.

The molecular weight of prothrombin is approximately 72,000 Da. The catalytic domain is released from prothrombin fragment 1.2 to create the active enzyme thrombin, which has a molecular weight of 36,000 Da. Structurally, it is a member of the large PA clan of proteases.

Prothrombin is composed of four domains; an N-terminal Gla domain, two kringle domains and a C-terminal trypsin-like serine protease domain. Factor Xa with factor V as a cofactor leads to cleavage of the Gla and two Kringle domains (forming together a fragment called fragment 1.2) and leave thrombin, consisting solely of the serine protease domain.

As is the case for all serine proteases, prothrombin is converted to active thrombin by proteolysis of an internal peptide bond, exposing a new N-terminal Ile-NH3. The historic model of activation of serine proteases involves insertion of this newly formed N-terminus of the heavy chain into the β-barrel promoting the correct conformation of the catalytic residues. Contrary to crystal structures of active thrombin, hydrogen-deuterium exchange mass spectrometry studies indicate that this N-terminal Ile-NH3 does not become inserted into the β-barrel in the apo form of thrombin. However, binding of the active fragment of thrombomodulin appears to allosterically promote the active conformation of thrombin by inserting this N-terminal region.

== Gene ==
There are an estimated 30 people in the world that have been diagnosed with the congenital form of Factor II deficiency, which should not be confused with the prothrombin G20210A mutation, which is also called the factor II mutation. Prothrombin G20210A is congenital.

Prothrombin G20210A is not usually accompanied by other factor mutations (i.e., the most common is factor V Leiden). The gene may be inherited heterozygous (1 pair), or much more rarely, homozygous (2 pairs), and is not related to gender or blood type. Homozygous mutations increase the risk of thrombosis more than heterozygous mutations, but the relative increased risk is not well documented. Other potential risks for thrombosis, such as oral contraceptives may be additive. The previously reported relationship of inflammatory bowel disease (i.e., Crohn's disease or ulcerative colitis) and prothrombin G20210A or factor V Leiden mutation have been contradicted by research.

== Role in disease ==
Activation of prothrombin is crucial in physiological and pathological coagulation. Various rare diseases involving prothrombin have been described (e.g., hypoprothrombinemia). Anti-prothrombin antibodies in autoimmune disease may be a factor in the formation of the lupus anticoagulant (also known as antiphospholipid syndrome). Hyperprothrombinemia can be caused by the G20210A mutation.

Thrombin, a potent vasoconstrictor and mitogen, is implicated as a major factor in vasospasm following subarachnoid hemorrhage. Blood from a ruptured cerebral aneurysm clots around a cerebral artery, releasing thrombin. This can induce an acute and prolonged narrowing of the blood vessel, potentially resulting in cerebral ischemia and infarction (stroke).

Beyond its key role in the dynamic process of thrombus formation, thrombin has a pronounced pro-inflammatory character, which may influence the onset and progression of atherosclerosis. Acting via its specific cell membrane receptors (protease activated receptors: PAR-1, PAR-3 and PAR-4), which are abundantly expressed in all arterial vessel wall constituents, thrombin has the potential to exert pro-atherogenic actions such as inflammation, leukocyte recruitment into the atherosclerotic plaque, enhanced oxidative stress, migration and proliferation of vascular smooth muscle cells, apoptosis and angiogenesis.

Thrombin is implicated in the physiology of blood clots. Its presence indicates the existence of a clot. In 2013 a system for detecting the presence of thrombin was developed in mice. It combines peptide-coated iron oxide attached to "reporter chemicals". When a peptide binds to a thrombin molecule, the report is released and appears in the urine where it can be detected. Human testing has not been conducted.

== Applications ==
=== Research tool ===
Due to its high proteolytic specificity, thrombin is a valuable biochemical tool. The thrombin cleavage site (Leu-Val-Pro-Arg-Gly-Ser) is commonly included in linker regions of recombinant fusion protein constructs. Following purification of the fusion protein, thrombin can be used to selectively cleave between the arginine and glycine residues of the cleavage site, effectively removing the purification tag from the protein of interest with a high degree of specificity.

=== Medicine and surgery ===
Prothrombin complex concentrate and fresh frozen plasma are prothrombin-rich coagulation factor preparations that can be used to correct deficiencies (usually due to medication) of prothrombin. Indications include intractable bleeding due to warfarin.

Manipulation of prothrombin is central to the mode of action of most anticoagulants. Warfarin and related drugs inhibit vitamin K-dependent carboxylation of several coagulation factors, including prothrombin. Heparin increases the affinity of antithrombin to thrombin (as well as factor Xa). The direct thrombin inhibitors, a newer class of medication, directly inhibit thrombin by binding to its active site.

Recombinant thrombin is available as a powder for reconstitution into aqueous solution. It can be applied topically during surgery, as an aid to hemostasis. It can be useful for controlling minor bleeding from capillaries and small venules, but ineffective and not indicated for massive or brisk arterial bleeding.

=== Food production ===
Thrombin, combined with fibrinogen, is sold under the brand name Fibrimex for use as a binding agent for meat. Both proteins in Fibrimex derives from porcine or bovine blood. According to the manufacturer it can be used to produce new kinds of mixed meats (for example combining beef and fish seamlessly). The manufacturer also states that it can be used to combine whole muscle meat, form and portion these, thus cutting down on production costs without a loss in quality.

General secretary Jan Bertoft of Swedish Consumers' Association has stated that "there is danger of misleading the consumers since there is no way to tell this reconstituted meat from real meat".

== See also ==
- Cerastocytin
- Fibrin glue
- Fibrinogen
- PA clan of proteases
- The Proteolysis Map
- Thrombin generation assay
