= Factor V Leiden =

Factor V Leiden thrombophilia
- Specialty: Hematology

Factor V Leiden (rs6025 or F5 p.R506Q) is a variant (mutated form) of human factor V (one of several substances that helps blood clot), which causes an increase in blood clotting (hypercoagulability). Due to this mutation, protein C, an anticoagulant protein that normally inhibits the pro-clotting activity of factor V, is not able to bind normally to factor V, leading to a hypercoagulable state, i.e., an increased tendency for the patient to form abnormal and potentially harmful blood clots. Factor V Leiden is the most common hereditary hypercoagulability (prone to clotting) disorder amongst ethnic Europeans. It is named after the Dutch city of Leiden, where it was first identified in 1994 by Rogier Maria Bertina under the direction of (and in the laboratory of) Pieter Hendrik Reitsma. Despite the increased risk of venous thromboembolisms, people with one copy of this gene have not been found to have shorter lives than the general population. It is an autosomal dominant genetic disorder with incomplete penetrance.

== Clinical manifestations ==
The clinical manifestation of factor V Leiden vary among individuals. There are individuals who have the factor V Leiden and who never develop thrombosis, while others have recurring thrombosis before the age of 30 years. This variability is influenced by the number of F5 gene (chromosome 1) mutations a person has, the presence of other gene alterations related to blood clotting, and circumstantial risk factors, such as surgery, use of oral contraceptives and pregnancy.

Clinical manifestations/complications of thrombosis associated with the condition are:

- Having a first DVT (deep vein thrombosis) or PE (pulmonary embolism) before age 50.
- Having recurring DVT or PE.
- Having venous thrombosis in unusual sites in the body such as the brain or the liver.
- Having a DVT or PE during or right after pregnancy.
- Having a history of unexplained pregnancy loss in the second or third trimester.
- Having a DVT or PE and a strong family history of venous thromboembolism.

The use of hormones, such as oral contraceptive pills (OCPs) and hormone replacement therapy (HRT), including estrogen and estrogen-like drugs taken after menopause, increases the risk of developing DVT and PE. Healthy women taking OCPs have a three- to four-fold increased risk of developing a DVT or PE compared with women who do not take OCP. Women with factor V Leiden who take OCPs have about a 35-fold increased risk of developing a DVT or PE compared with women without factor V Leiden and those who do not take OCPs. Likewise, postmenopausal women taking HRT have a two- to three-fold higher risk of developing a DVT or PE than women who do not take HRT, and women with factor V Leiden who take HRT have a 15-fold higher risk. Women with heterozygous factor V Leiden who are making decisions about OCP or HRT use should take these statistics into consideration when weighing the risks and benefits of treatment.

== Pathophysiology ==
SNP: rs6025
- Name(s): Factor V Leiden, Arg506Gln, R506Q, G1691A
- Gene: Factor V
- Chromosome: 1

External databases
- Ensembl: Human SNPView
- dbSNP: 6025
- HapMap: 6025
- SNPedia: 6025
- ALFRED: SI001216K

Blood clotting, or coagulation, is a vital process that prevents excessive bleeding when a blood vessel is injured. Two primary pathways, the intrinsic and extrinsic, initiate this process. The intrinsic pathway is triggered by internal damage to the blood vessel wall, whereas the extrinsic pathway is triggered by tissue cell trauma. In both pathways, factor V functions as a cofactor to allow factor Xa to activate prothrombin, resulting in the enzyme thrombin. Thrombin in turn cleaves fibrinogen to form fibrin, which polymerizes to form the dense meshwork that makes up the majority of a clot. Activated protein C is a natural anticoagulant that acts to limit the extent of clotting by cleaving and degrading factor V.

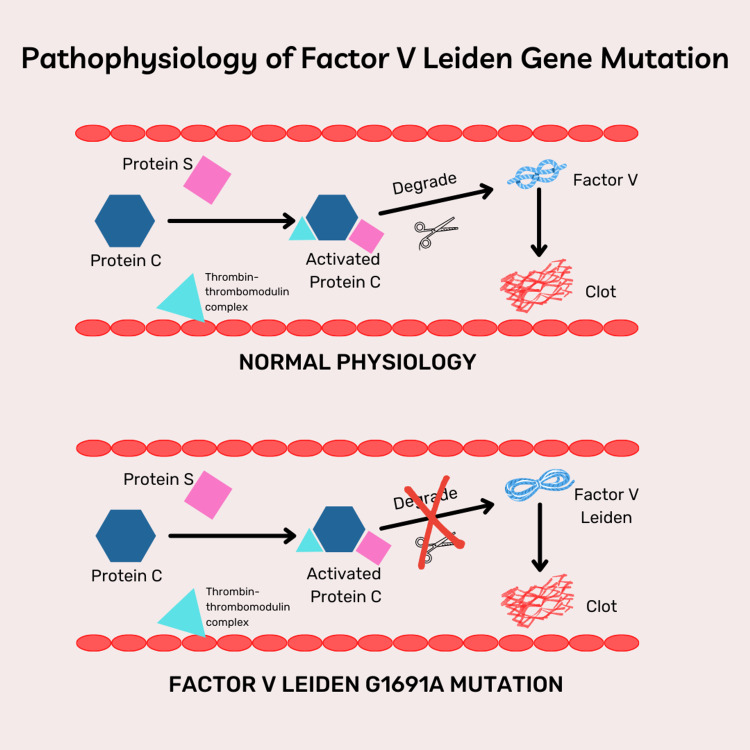
Pathophysiology of factor V Leiden gene mutation

Factor V Leiden is an autosomal dominant genetic condition that exhibits incomplete penetrance, i.e. not every person who has the mutation develops the disease. The condition results in a factor V variant that cannot be as easily degraded by activated protein C. The gene that codes the protein is referred to as F5. Most humans have a normal F5 gene and the normal factor V. Mutation of this gene—a single nucleotide polymorphism (SNP) is located in exon 10. As a missense substitution of amino acid R to amino acid Q, it changes the protein's amino acid from arginine to glutamine. Depending on the chosen start the position of the nucleotide variant is either at position 1691 or 1746. It also affects the amino acid position for the variant, which is either 506 or 534. (Together with the general lack of nomenclature standard, this variance means that the SNP can be referred to in several ways, such as G1691A, c.1691G>A, 1691G>A, c.1746G>A, p.Arg534Gln, Arg506Gln, R506Q or rs6025.) Since this amino acid is normally the cleavage site for activated protein C, the mutation prevents efficient inactivation of factor V. When factor V remains active, it facilitates overproduction of thrombin leading to generation of excess fibrin and excess clotting.

The excessive clotting that occurs in this disorder is almost always restricted to the veins, where the clotting may cause a deep vein thrombosis (DVT). If the venous clots break off, these clots can travel through the right side of the heart to the lung where they block a pulmonary blood vessel and cause a pulmonary embolism. It is extremely rare for this disorder to cause the formation of clots in arteries that can lead to stroke or heart attack, though a "mini-stroke", known as a transient ischemic attack, is more common. Given that this disease displays incomplete dominance, those who are homozygous for the mutated allele are at a heightened risk for the events detailed above versus those who are heterozygous for the mutation.

== Diagnosis ==
Suspicion of factor V Leiden being the cause for any thrombotic event should be considered in any Caucasian patient below the age of 45, or in any person with a family history of venous thrombosis.

Factor 5 Leiden mutation is detected by a genetic test. The mutation (a 1691G→A substitution) removes a cleavage site of the restriction endonuclease MnlI, so PCR, treatment with MnlI, and then DNA electrophoresis can be used to identify the variant.Other PCR based assays such as iPLEX can also identify zygosity and frequency of the variant.

Factor V Leiden can also be suggested by functional testing for activated protein C (APC) resistance.This testing measures the response of the coagulation system to activated protein C rather than directly detecting the genetic variant. Low APC resistance can have causes other than Factor V Leiden, so molecular genetic testing may be used to confirm the diagnosis and determine the individual's genotype. To diagnose activated protein C (APC) resistance, most laboratories screen 'at risk' patients with either a snake venom (e.g. dilute Russell's viper venom time) based test or an aPTT based test.

== Management ==
As there is no cure yet, treatment is focused on prevention of thrombotic complications. Anticoagulants are not routinely recommended for people with heterozygous factor V Leiden, unless there are additional risk factors present, but are given when such an event occurs. A single occurrence of deep vein thrombosis or pulmonary embolism in people with factor V Leiden warrants temporary anticoagulant treatment, but generally not lifelong treatment. In addition, temporary treatment with an anticoagulant such as heparin may be required during periods of particularly high risk of thrombosis, such as major surgery. People with homozygous factor V Leiden or heterozygous factor V Leiden with additional thrombophilia however should be considered for lifelong oral anticoagulation.

== Epidemiology ==
Studies have found that about 5 percent of Caucasians in North America have factor V Leiden. Data have indicated that prevalence of factor V Leiden is greater among Caucasians than minority Americans. One study also suggested "that the factor V‐Leiden mutation segregates in populations with significant Caucasian admixture and is rare in genetically distant non‐European groups." Up to 30 percent of patients who present with deep vein thrombosis (DVT) or pulmonary embolism have this condition. The risk of developing a clot in a blood vessel depends on whether a person inherits one or two copies of the factor V Leiden mutation. Inheriting one copy of the mutation from a parent (heterozygous) increases by fourfold to eightfold the chance of developing a clot. People who inherit two copies of the mutation (homozygous), one from each parent, may have up to 80 times the usual risk of developing this type of blood clot. Considering that the risk of developing an abnormal blood clot averages about 1 in 1,000 per year in the general population, the presence of one copy of the factor V Leiden mutation increases that risk to between 3 in 1,000 to 8 in 1,000. Having two copies of the mutation may raise the risk as high as 80 in 1,000. It is unclear whether these individuals are at increased risk for recurrent venous thrombosis. While only 1 percent of people with factor V Leiden have two copies of the defective gene, these homozygous individuals have a more severe clinical condition. The presence of acquired risk factors for venous thrombosis—including smoking, use of estrogen-containing (combined) forms of hormonal contraception, and recent surgery—further increase the chance that an individual with the factor V Leiden mutation will develop DVT.

Women with factor V Leiden have a substantially increased risk of clotting in pregnancy (and on estrogen-containing birth control pills or hormone replacement) in the form of deep vein thrombosis and pulmonary embolism. They also may have a small increased risk of preeclampsia, may have a small increased risk of low birth weight babies, may have a small increased risk of miscarriage and stillbirth due to either clotting in the placenta, umbilical cord, or the fetus (fetal clotting may depend on whether the baby has inherited the gene) or influences the clotting system may have on placental development. Note that many of these women go through one or more pregnancies with no difficulties, while others may repeatedly have pregnancy complications, and still others may develop clots within weeks of becoming pregnant.

== See also ==
- Prothrombin G20210A
