= Vitamin K-dependent protein =

A Vitamin K-dependent protein (VKDP) is a protein that can bind calcium ions but only after being carboxylated at a certain glutamic residue. This carboxylation, said to activate the protein, is facilitated by some form of vitamin K_{1} or vitamin K_{2}. The relevant part of a vitamin K-dependent protein is a Gla domain, and such a protein is informally called a Gla protein. Some Gla proteins have "Gla" in their name, for example Matrix Gla protein, but many don't, such as osteocalcin.
