= Carboxyglutamic acid =

Names
- Systematic IUPAC name 3-Aminopropane-1,1,3-tricarboxylic acid
- Other names γ-Carboxyglutamate

Identifiers
CAS Number	53861-57-7
3D model (JSmol)	Interactive image
ChEBI	CHEBI:41450
ChemSpider	37241
ECHA InfoCard	100.054.607
PubChem CID	40772
UNII	16FQV4RZKL
CompTox Dashboard (EPA)	DTXSID50872037
- InChI: InChI=1/C6H9NO6/c7-3(6(12)13)1-2(4(8)9)5(10)11/h2-3H,1,7H2,(H,8,9)(H,10,11)(H,12,13) Key: UHBYWPGGCSDKFX-UHFFFAOYAH
- SMILES: O=C(O)C(C(=O)O)CC(N)C(=O)O

Properties
Chemical formula	C_{6}H_{9}NO_{6}
Molar mass	191.14 g/mol
Density	1.649 g/mL
Boiling point	418 °C (784 °F; 691 K)
- Except where otherwise noted, data are given for materials in their standard state (at 25 °C [77 °F], 100 kPa). Infobox references

Carboxyglutamic acid (or the conjugate base, carboxyglutamate), is an uncommon amino acid introduced into proteins by a post-translational carboxylation of glutamic acid residues. This modification is found, for example, in clotting factors and other proteins of the coagulation cascade. This modification introduces an affinity for calcium ions. In the blood coagulation cascade, vitamin K is required to introduce γ-carboxylation of clotting factors II, VII, IX, X and protein Z.

== Synthesis ==
In the biosynthesis of γ-carboxyglutamic acid, the γ-proton on glutamic acid is abstracted, and CO_{2} is subsequently added. The reaction intermediate is a γ-glutamyl carbanion.

This reaction is catalyzed by a carboxylase that requires vitamin K as its cofactor. It is not exactly known how vitamin K participates, but it is hypothesized that a free cysteine residue in the carboxylase converts vitamin K into an active strong base that in turn abstracts a hydrogen from glutamic acid's γ-carbon. Then CO_{2} is added to the γ-carbon to form γ-carboxyglutamic acid.

== γ-Carboxyglutamic acid-rich (GLA) domain ==
A number of γ-carboxyglutamate residues are present in the γ-carboxyglutamic acid-rich ("GLA") domain. This GLA domain is known to be found in over a dozen known proteins, including coagulation factors X, VII, IX, and XIV, vitamin K-dependent protein S and Z, prothrombin, transthyretin, osteocalcin, matrix Gla protein (MGP), inter-alpha trypsin inhibitor heavy chain H2, and growth arrest-specific protein 6 (GAS6). The Gla domain is responsible for high-affinity binding of calcium ions (Ca^{2+}) to Gla proteins, which is often necessary for their conformation, and always necessary for their function.

== Role in coagulation ==
γ-Carboxyglutamic acid residues play an important role in coagulation. The high-affinity calcium binding sites in the GLA domain of factor IX, which is a serine protease of the coagulation system, were found to partially mediate the binding of factor IXa to platelets and in factor-X activation. In addition, upon mechanical injury to the blood vessel wall, a cell-associated tissue factor becomes exposed and initiates a series of enzymatic reactions localized on a membrane surface generally provided by cells and accumulating platelets. Gla residues partly govern the activation and binding of circulating blood-clotting enzymes and zymogens to this exposed cell membrane surface. Specifically, gla residues are needed in calcium binding and in exposing hydrophobic membrane binding regions to the cell bilayer. Lack of these gla residues results in impaired coagulation or even anticoagulation, which may lead to bleeding diathesis or thrombosis. In addition, removal of calcium ion from these proteins with an organic chelator, such as citrate ion, causes their dysfunction, and prevents blood from coagulating. Thus, citrate addition to blood is the most common method of storing it in a liquid state between harvest and transfusion.

== See also ==
- Gamma-glutamyl carboxylase
