= Vitamin K =

Fat-soluble vitamers

- Drug class
- Vitamin K structures

Class identifiers
- Use: Vitamin K deficiency, Warfarin overdose
- ATC code: B02BA
- Biological target: Gamma-glutamyl carboxylase

Clinical data
- Drugs.com: Medical Encyclopedia

External links
- MeSH: D014812

Legal status

Vitamin K is a family of fat-soluble, structurally similar vitamers found in foods and marketed as dietary supplements. The human body requires vitamin K for post-synthesis modification of certain proteins that are required for blood coagulation ("K" from Danish koagulation, for "coagulation") and for controlling binding of calcium in bones and other tissues. The complete synthesis involves final modification of these so-called "Gla proteins" by the enzyme gamma-glutamyl carboxylase that uses vitamin K as a cofactor.

Vitamin K is used in the liver as the intermediate VKH_{2} to deprotonate a glutamate residue and then is reprocessed into vitamin K through a vitamin K oxide intermediate. The presence of uncarboxylated proteins indicates a vitamin K deficiency. Carboxylation allows them to bind (chelate) calcium ions, which they cannot do otherwise. Without vitamin K, blood coagulation is seriously impaired, and uncontrolled bleeding occurs. Research suggests that deficiency of vitamin K may also weaken bones, potentially contributing to osteoporosis, and may promote calcification of arteries and other soft tissues.

Chemically, the vitamin K family comprises 2-methyl-1,4-naphthoquinone derivatives at position 3. Vitamin K includes two natural vitamers: vitamin K_{1} (phylloquinone) and vitamin K_{2} (menaquinone). Vitamin K_{2}, in turn, consists of several related chemical subtypes, with differing lengths of carbon side chains made of isoprenoid groups of atoms. The two most studied are menaquinone-4 (MK-4) and menaquinone-7 (MK-7).

Vitamin K_{1} is made by plants, and is found in highest amounts in green leafy vegetables, being directly involved in photosynthesis. It is active as a vitamin in animals and performs the classic functions of vitamin K, including its activity in the production of blood-clotting proteins. Animals may also convert it to vitamin K_{2}, variant MK-4. Bacteria in the gut flora can also convert K_{1} into K_{2}. All forms of K_{2} other than MK-4 can only be produced by bacteria, which use these during anaerobic respiration. Vitamin K_{3} (menadione), a synthetic form of vitamin K, was used to treat vitamin K deficiency, but because it interferes with the function of glutathione, it is no longer used in this manner in human nutrition.

== Definition ==
Vitamin K refers to several structurally similar, fat-soluble vitamers found in foods and marketed as dietary supplements. These are similar in structure in that they share a quinone ring, but differ in the length and degree of saturation of the carbon tail and the number of repeating isoprene units in the side chain (see figures in § Chemistry). Plant-sourced forms are primarily vitamin K_{1}. Animal-sourced foods are primarily vitamin K_{2}. Vitamin K has several roles: an essential nutrient absorbed from food, a product synthesized and marketed as part of a multi-vitamin or as a single-vitamin dietary supplement, and a prescription medication for specific purposes.

== Dietary recommendations ==
The US National Academy of Medicine does not distinguish between K_{1} and K_{2} – both are counted as vitamin K. When recommendations were last updated, in 1998, sufficient information was not available to establish an estimated average requirement or recommended dietary allowance, as for most vitamins. In instances such as these, the academy defines adequate intakes (AIs) as amounts that appear to be sufficient to maintain good health, with the understanding that at some later date, AIs will be replaced by more exact information. The current AIs for adult women and men ages 19 and older are 90 and 120 μg/day, respectively, for pregnancy, 90 μg/day, and for lactation, 90 μg/day. For infants up to 12 months, the AI is 2.0–2.5 μg/day; for children ages 1–18 years the AI increases with age from 30 to 75 μg/day. As for safety, the academy sets tolerable upper intake levels (known as "upper limits") for vitamins and minerals when evidence is sufficient. Vitamin K has no upper limit, as human data for adverse effects from high doses are not sufficient.

In the European Union, adequate intake is defined the same way as in the US. For women and men over age 18 the adequate intake is set at 70 μg/day, for pregnancy 70 μg/day, and for lactation 70 μg/day. For children ages 1–17 years, adequate intake values increase with age from 12 to 65 μg/day. Japan set adequate intakes for adult women at 65 μg/day and for men at 75 μg/day. The European Union and Japan also reviewed safety and concluded – as had the United States – that there was insufficient evidence to set an upper limit for vitamin K.

For US food and dietary supplement labeling purposes, the amount in a serving is expressed as a percentage of daily value. For vitamin K labeling purposes, 100% of the daily value was 80 μg, but on 27 May 2016 it was revised upwards to 120 μg, to bring it into agreement with the highest value for adequate intake. Compliance with the updated labeling regulations was required by 1 January 2020 for manufacturers with US$10 million or more in annual food sales, and by 1 January 2021 for manufacturers with lower volume food sales. A table of the old and new adult daily values is provided at Reference Daily Intake.

=== Fortification ===
According to the Global Fortification Data Exchange, vitamin K deficiency is so rare that no countries require that foods be fortified. The World Health Organization does not have recommendations on vitamin K fortification.

== Sources ==
Vitamin K_{1} is primarily from plants, especially leafy green vegetables. Small amounts are provided by animal-sourced foods. Vitamin K_{2} is primarily from animal-sourced foods, with poultry and eggs much better sources than beef, pork or fish. One exception to the latter is nattō, which is made from bacteria-fermented soybeans. It is a rich food source of vitamin K_{2} variant MK-7, made by the bacteria.

=== Vitamin K_{1} ===
Plant-sourced	Amount K_{1} (μg / measure)
Collard greens boiled, drained, 1/2 cup (~120 mL)	530
Spinach boiled, drained, 1/2 cup (~120 mL)	445
Turnip greens boiled, drained, 1/2 cup (~120 mL)	425
Spinach raw, 1 cup (~240 mL)	145
Kale raw, 1 cup (~240 mL)	82
Broccoli boiled, drained, 1/2 cup (~120 mL)	81
Kiwifruit peeled, sliced, 1/2 cup (~120 mL)	36
Chinese cabbage cooked, 1/2 cup (~120 mL)	29
Blueberries frozen, 1/2 cup (~120 mL)	21

Plant-sourced	Amount K_{1} (μg / measure)
Hazelnuts chopped, 1 cup (~240 mL)	16
Grapes, 1/2 cup (~120 mL)	11
Tomato products, 1 cup (~240 mL)	9.2
Olive oil, 1 tbsp (15 mL)	8.1
Zucchini boiled, drained, 1 cup (~240 mL)	7.6
Mango pieces, 1 cup (~240 mL)	6.9
Pears, pieces, 1 cup (~240 mL)	6.2
Potato baked, including skin, one	6.0
Sweet potato baked, one	2.6
Bread whole wheat, 1 slice	2.5
Bread white, 1 slice	2.2
Nattō, 100 g	34.7

Animal-sourced	Amount K_{1} (μg / measure)
Chicken, 113 g (4 oz)	2.7–3.3
Mollusks, 113 g (4 oz)	2.2
Cheese diced, 1/2 cup (~120 mL)	1.4–1.7
Beef, 113 g (4 oz)	0.9
Pork sausage, 113 g (4 oz)	0.9
Yogurt whole milk, 1 cup (~240 mL)	0.4
Milk whole or low fat, 1 cup (~240 mL)	0.2
Fish, 113 g (4 oz)	0.1
Eggs, one	0.1
Human milk, 1 liter	0.85–9.2 (median 2.5)

=== Vitamin K_{2} ===
Animal-sourced foods are a source of vitamin K_{2}. The MK-4 form is from conversion of plant-sourced vitamin K_{1} in various tissues in the body.

Animal source	Amount K_{2} MK-4 to MK-7 (μg / 100 g)
Goose	31
Chicken	8.9
Pork	2.1
Beef	1.1
Salmon	0.5
Egg yolk	32
Egg white	0.9

Animal source	Amount K_{2} MK-4 to MK-7 (μg / 100 g)
Milk, whole	0.9
Milk, skim	0.0
Yogurt, whole milk	0.9
Butter	15
Cheese, hard	8–10
Cheese, soft	3.6

Fermented source	Amount K_{2} MK-4 to MK-7 (μg / 100 g)
Nattō	1103 (90% MK-7)

== Vitamin K deficiency ==
Because vitamin K aids mechanisms for blood clotting, its deficiency may lead to reduced blood clotting, and in severe cases, can result in increased bleeding and increased prothrombin time.

Normal diets are usually not deficient in vitamin K, indicating that deficiency is uncommon in healthy children and adults. An exception may be infants who are at an increased risk of deficiency regardless of the vitamin status of the mother during pregnancy and breast feeding due to poor transfer of the vitamin to the placenta and low amounts of the vitamin in breast milk.

Secondary deficiencies can occur in people who consume adequate amounts, but have malabsorption conditions, such as cystic fibrosis or chronic pancreatitis, and in people who have liver damage or disease. Secondary vitamin K deficiency can also occur in people who have a prescription for a vitamin K antagonist drug, such as warfarin. A drug associated with increased risk of vitamin K deficiency is cefamandole, although the mechanism is unknown.

== Medical uses ==
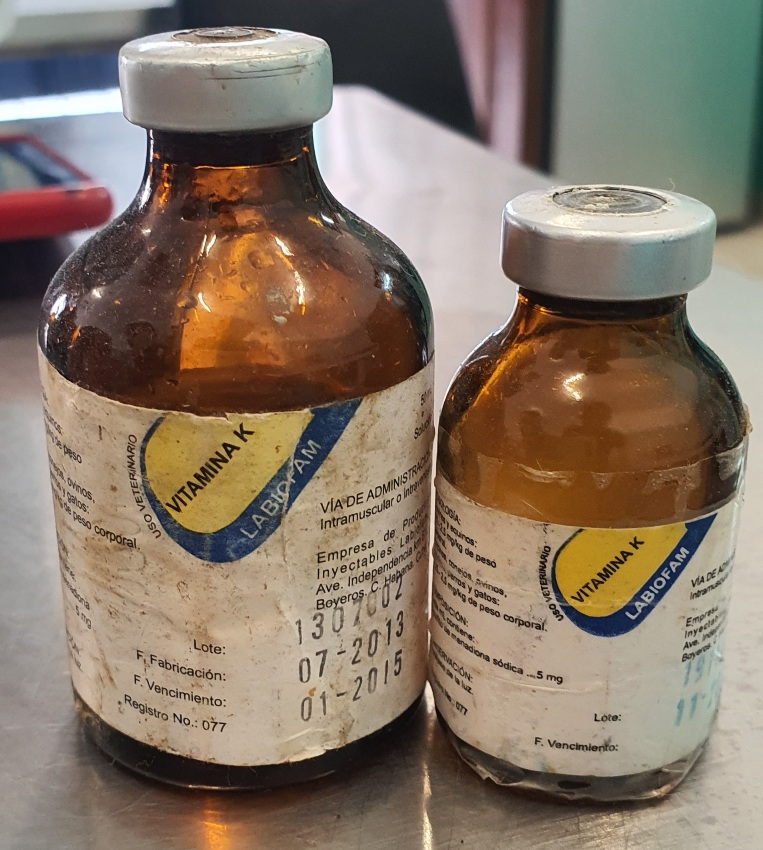
Injectable solutions of vitamin K

=== Treating vitamin deficiency in newborns ===
Vitamin K_{1} is given as an injection to newborns to prevent vitamin K deficiency bleeding. The blood clotting factors of newborn babies are roughly 30–60% that of adult values; this appears to be a consequence of poor transfer of the vitamin across the placenta, and thus low fetal plasma vitamin K. Occurrence of vitamin K deficiency bleeding in the first week of the infant's life is estimated at between 1 in 60 and 1 in 250.

Human milk contains 0.85–9.2 μg/L (median 2.5 μg/L) of vitamin K_{1}, while infant formula is formulated in range of 24–175 μg/L. Late onset bleeding, with onset 2 to 12 weeks after birth, can be a consequence of exclusive breastfeeding, especially if there was no preventive treatment. Late onset prevalence reported at 35 cases per 100,000 live births in infants who had not received prophylaxis at or shortly after birth. Vitamin K deficiency bleeding occurs more frequently in the Asian population compared to the Caucasian population.

Bleeding in infants due to vitamin K deficiency can be severe, leading to hospitalization, brain damage, and death. Intramuscular injection, typically given shortly after birth, is more effective in preventing vitamin K deficiency bleeding than oral administration, which calls for weekly dosing up to three months of age.

=== Managing warfarin therapy ===
Warfarin is an anticoagulant drug. It functions by inhibiting an enzyme that is responsible for recycling vitamin K to a functional state. As a consequence, proteins that should be modified by vitamin K are not, including proteins essential to blood clotting, and are thus not functional. The purpose of the drug is to reduce risk of inappropriate blood clotting, which can have serious, potentially fatal consequences. The proper anticoagulant action of warfarin is a function of vitamin K intake and drug dose. Due to differing absorption of the drug and amounts of vitamin K in the diet, dosing must be monitored and customized for each patient. Some foods are so high in vitamin K_{1} that medical advice is to avoid those (examples: collard greens, spinach, turnip greens) entirely, and for foods with a modestly high vitamin content, keep consumption as consistent as possible, so that the combination of vitamin intake and warfarin keep the anti-clotting activity in the therapeutic range.

Vitamin K is a treatment for bleeding events caused by overdose of the drug. The vitamin can be administered by mouth, intravenously or subcutaneously. Oral vitamin K is used in situations when a person's International normalized ratio is greater than 10 but there is no active bleeding. The newer anticoagulants apixaban, dabigatran and rivaroxaban are not vitamin K antagonists.

=== Treating rodenticide poisoning ===
Coumarin is used in the pharmaceutical industry as a precursor reagent in the synthesis of a number of synthetic anticoagulant pharmaceuticals. One subset, 4-hydroxycoumarins, act as vitamin K antagonists. They block the regeneration and recycling of vitamin K. Some of the 4-hydroxycoumarin anticoagulant class of chemicals are designed to have high potency and long residence times in the body, and these are used specifically as second generation rodenticides ("rat poison"). Death occurs after a period of several days to two weeks, usually from internal hemorrhaging. For humans, and for animals that have consumed either the rodenticide or rats poisoned by the rodenticide, treatment is prolonged administration of large amounts of vitamin K. This dosing must sometimes be continued for up to nine months in cases of poisoning by "superwarfarin" rodenticides such as brodifacoum. Oral vitamin K_{1} is preferred over other vitamin K_{1} routes of administration because it has fewer side effects.

=== Methods of assessment ===
An increase in prothrombin time, a coagulation assay, has been used as an indicator of vitamin K status, but it lacks sufficient sensitivity and specificity for this application.

Serum phylloquinone is the most commonly used marker of vitamin K status. Concentrations <0.15 μg/L are indicative of deficiency. Disadvantages include exclusion of the other vitamin K vitamers and interference from recent dietary intake.

Vitamin K is required for the gamma-carboxylation of specific glutamic acid residues within the Gla domain of the 17 vitamin K–dependent proteins. Thus, a rise in uncarboxylated versions of these proteins is an indirect but sensitive and specific marker for vitamin K deficiency.

- If uncarboxylated prothrombin is being measured, this "Protein induced by Vitamin K Absence/antagonism (PIVKA-II)" is elevated in vitamin K deficiency. The test is used to assess risk of vitamin K–deficient bleeding in newborn infants.
- Osteocalcin is involved in calcification of bone tissue. The ratio of uncarboxylated osteocalcin to carboxylated osteocalcin increases with vitamin K deficiency. Vitamin K2 has been shown to lower this ratio and improve lumbar vertebrae bone mineral density.
- Matrix Gla protein must undergo vitamin K dependent phosphorylation and carboxylation. Elevated plasma concentration of dephosphorylated, uncarboxylated MGP is indicative of vitamin K deficiency.

=== Synthetic forms ===
Some synthetic compounds also have vitamin K activity in humans. One synthetic drug with vitamin K activity still used in developed countries (the UK) is menadiol sodium diphosphate. Unlike natural vitamin K, it is water-soluble and can be absorbed without the help of bile salts.

=== Side effects ===
No known toxicity is associated with high oral doses of the vitamin K_{1} or vitamin K_{2} forms of vitamin K, so regulatory agencies from US, Japan and European Union concur that no tolerable upper intake levels needs to be set. However, vitamin K_{1} has been associated with severe adverse reactions such as bronchospasm and cardiac arrest when given intravenously. The reaction is described as a nonimmune-mediated anaphylactoid reaction, with incidence of 3 per 10,000 treatments. The majority of reactions occurred when polyoxyethylated castor oil was used as the solubilizing agent.

== Non-human uses ==
Menadione, a natural compound sometimes referred to as vitamin K_{3}, is used in the pet food industry because once consumed it is converted to vitamin K_{2}. The US Food and Drug Administration has banned this form from sale as a human dietary supplement because overdoses have been shown to cause allergic reactions, hemolytic anemia, and cytotoxicity in liver cells.

4-amino-2-methyl-1-naphthol is a synthetic menadione analog often called vitamin K_{5}. It has been used as a medicine for vitamin K deficiency. Research with K_{5} suggests it may inhibit fungal growth in fruit juices.

== Chemistry ==
Vitamin K_{1} (phylloquinone) – both forms of the vitamin contain a functional naphthoquinone ring and an aliphatic side chain. Phylloquinone has a phytyl side chain.

Vitamin K_{2} (menaquinone). In menaquinone, the side chain is composed of a varying number of isoprenoid residues. The most common number of these residues is four, since animal enzymes normally produce menaquinone-4 from plant phylloquinone.

The structure of phylloquinone, vitamin K_{1}, is marked by the presence of a phytyl sidechain. Vitamin K_{1} has an (E) trans double bond responsible for its biological activity, and two chiral centers on the phytyl sidechain. Vitamin K_{1} appears as a yellow viscous liquid at room temperature due to its absorption of violet light in the UV–visible spectra obtained by ultraviolet–visible spectroscopy. The structures of menaquinones, vitamin K_{2}, are marked by the polyisoprenyl side chain present in the molecule that can contain four to 13 isoprenyl units. MK-4 is the most common form. The large size of vitamin K_{1} gives many different peaks in mass spectroscopy, most of which involve derivatives of the naphthoquinone ring base and the alkyl side chain.

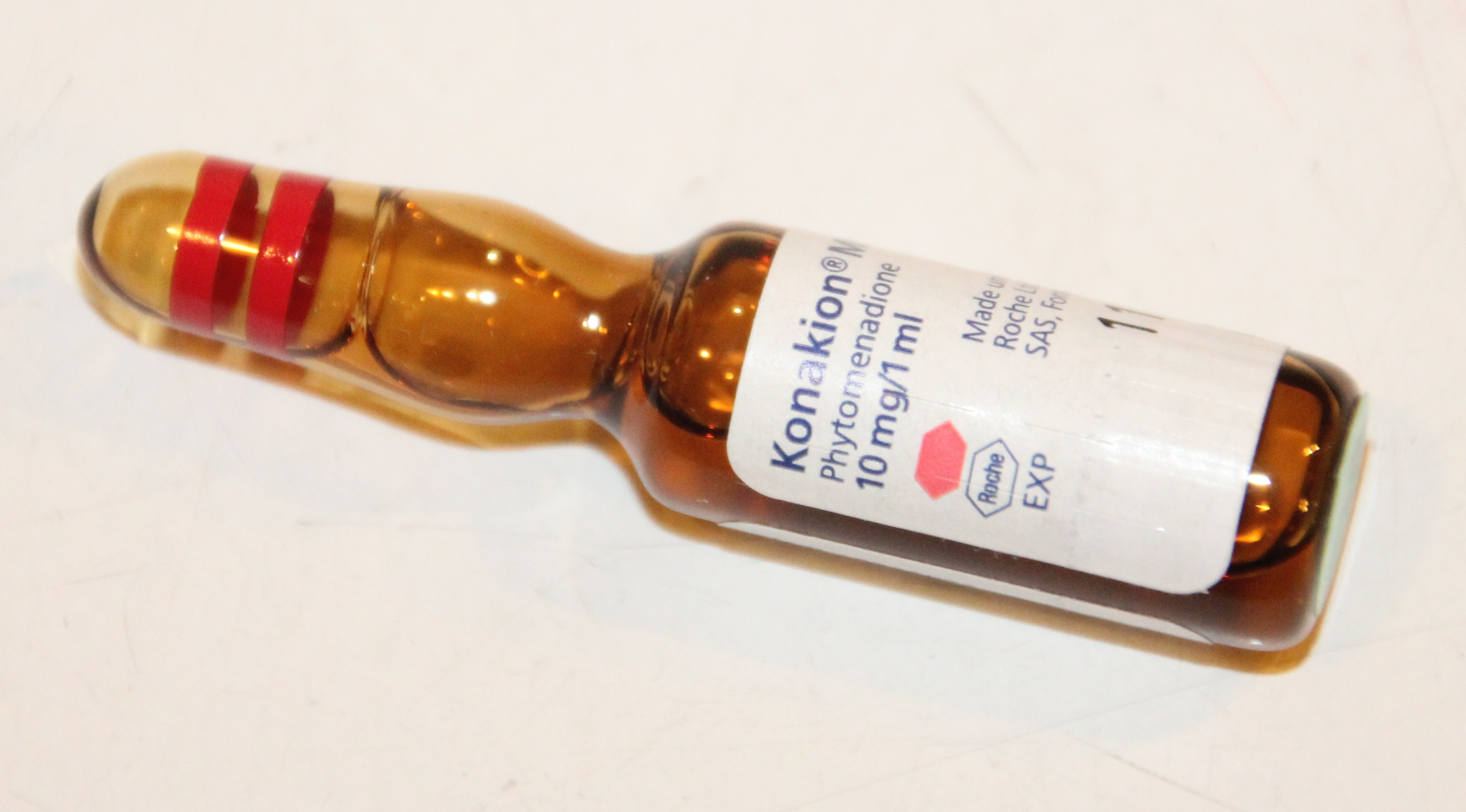
A sample of phytomenadione for injection, also called phylloquinone

=== Conversion of vitamin K_{1} to vitamin K_{2} ===
In animals, the MK-4 form of vitamin K_{2} is produced by conversion of vitamin K_{1} in the testes, pancreas, and arterial walls. While major questions still surround the biochemical pathway for this transformation, the conversion is not dependent on gut bacteria, as it occurs in germ-free rats and in parenterally administered K_{1} in rats. There is evidence that the conversion proceeds by removal of the phytyl tail of K_{1} to produce menadione (also referred to as vitamin K_{3}) as an intermediate, which is then prenylated to produce MK-4.

== Physiology ==
In animals, vitamin K is involved in the carboxylation of certain glutamate residues in proteins to form gamma-carboxyglutamate (Gla) residues. The modified residues are often (but not always) situated within specific protein domains called Gla domains. Gla residues are usually involved in binding calcium, and are essential for the biological activity of all known Gla proteins.

Seventeen human proteins with Gla domains have been discovered; they play key roles in the regulation of three physiological processes:

- Blood coagulation: prothrombin (factor II), factors VII, IX, and X, and proteins C, S, and Z
- Bone metabolism: osteocalcin, matrix Gla protein (MGP), periostin, and Gla-rich protein.
- Vascular biology: Matrix Gla protein, growth arrest – specific protein 6 (Gas6)
- Unknown functions: proline-rich γ-carboxyglutamyl proteins 1 and 2, and transmembrane γ-carboxy glutamyl proteins 3 and 4.

=== Absorption ===
Vitamin K is absorbed through the jejunum and ileum in the small intestine. The process requires bile and pancreatic juices. Estimates for absorption are on the order of 80% for vitamin K_{1} in its free form (as a dietary supplement) but much lower when present in foods. For example, the absorption of vitamin K from kale and spinach – foods identified as having a high vitamin K content – are on the order of 4% to 17% regardless of whether raw or cooked. Less information is available for absorption of vitamin K_{2} from foods.

The intestinal membrane protein Niemann–Pick C1-like 1 (NPC1L1) mediates cholesterol absorption. Animal studies show that it also factors into absorption of vitamins E and K_{1}. The same study predicts potential interaction between SR-BI and CD36 proteins as well. The drug ezetimibe inhibits NPC1L1 causing a reduction in cholesterol absorption in humans, and in animal studies, also reduces vitamin E and vitamin K_{1} absorption. An expected consequence would be that administration of ezetimibe to people who take warfarin (a vitamin K antagonist) would potentiate the warfarin effect. This has been confirmed in humans.

== Biochemistry ==
=== Function in animals ===
Cyclic mechanism of action of vitamin K

Vitamin K hydroquinone

Vitamin K epoxide

In both cases R represents the isoprenoid side chain.

Vitamin K is distributed differently within animals depending on its specific homologue. Vitamin K_{1} is mainly present in the liver, heart and pancreas, while MK-4 is better represented in the kidneys, brain and pancreas. The liver also contains longer chain homologues MK-7 to MK-13.

The function of vitamin K_{2} in the animal cell is to add a carboxylic acid functional group to a glutamate (Glu) amino acid residue in a protein, to form a gamma-carboxyglutamate (Gla) residue. This is a somewhat uncommon posttranslational modification of the protein, which is then known as a "Gla protein". The presence of two −COOH (carboxylic acid) groups on the same carbon in the gamma-carboxyglutamate residue allows it to chelate calcium ions. The binding of calcium ions in this way very often triggers the function or binding of Gla-protein enzymes, such as the so-called vitamin K–dependent clotting factors discussed below.

Within the cell, vitamin K participates in a cyclic process. The vitamin undergoes electron reduction to a reduced form called vitamin K hydroquinone (quinol), catalyzed by the enzyme vitamin K epoxide reductase (VKOR). Another enzyme then oxidizes vitamin K hydroquinone to allow carboxylation of Glu to Gla; this enzyme is called gamma-glutamyl carboxylase or the vitamin K–dependent carboxylase. The carboxylation reaction only proceeds if the carboxylase enzyme is able to oxidize vitamin K hydroquinone to vitamin K epoxide at the same time. The carboxylation and epoxidation reactions are said to be coupled. Vitamin K epoxide is then restored to vitamin K by VKOR. The reduction and subsequent reoxidation of vitamin K coupled with carboxylation of Glu is called the vitamin K cycle. Humans are rarely deficient in vitamin K because, in part, vitamin K_{2} is continuously recycled in cells.

Warfarin and other 4-hydroxycoumarins block the action of VKOR. This results in decreased concentrations of vitamin K and vitamin K hydroquinone in tissues, such that the carboxylation reaction catalyzed by the glutamyl carboxylase is inefficient. This results in the production of clotting factors with inadequate Gla. Without Gla on the amino termini of these factors, they no longer bind stably to the blood vessel endothelium and cannot activate clotting to allow formation of a clot during tissue injury. As it is impossible to predict what dose of warfarin will give the desired degree of clotting suppression, warfarin treatment must be carefully monitored to avoid underdose and overdose.

==== Gamma-carboxyglutamate proteins ====
The following human Gla-containing proteins ("Gla proteins") have been characterized to the level of primary structure: blood coagulation factors II (prothrombin), VII, IX, and X, anticoagulant protein C and protein S, and the factor X-targeting protein Z. The bone Gla protein osteocalcin, the calcification-inhibiting matrix Gla protein (MGP), the cell growth regulating growth arrest specific gene 6 protein, and the four transmembrane Gla proteins, the function of which is at present unknown. The Gla domain is responsible for high-affinity binding of calcium ions (Ca^{2+}) to Gla proteins, which is often necessary for their conformation, and always necessary for their function.

Gla proteins are known to occur in a wide variety of vertebrates: mammals, birds, reptiles, and fish. The venom of a number of Australian snakes acts by activating the human blood-clotting system. In some cases, activation is accomplished by snake Gla-containing enzymes that bind to the endothelium of human blood vessels and catalyze the conversion of procoagulant clotting factors into activated ones, leading to unwanted and potentially deadly clotting.

Another interesting class of invertebrate Gla-containing proteins is synthesized by the fish-hunting snail Conus geographus. These snails produce a venom containing hundreds of neuroactive peptides, or conotoxins, which is sufficiently toxic to kill an adult human. Several of the conotoxins contain two to five Gla residues. The Gla-modification signal is different from the vertebrate Gla domain.

=== Function in plants and cyanobacteria ===
Vitamin K_{1} is an important chemical in green plants (including land plants and green algae) and some species of cyanobacteria, where it functions as an electron acceptor transferring one electron in photosystem I during photosynthesis. For this reason, vitamin K_{1} is found in large quantities in the photosynthetic tissues of plants (green leaves, and dark green leafy vegetables such as romaine lettuce, kale, and spinach), but it occurs in far smaller quantities in other plant tissues.

Detection of VKORC1 homologues active on the K_{1}-epioxide suggest that K_{1} may have a non-redox function in these organisms. In plants but not cyanobacteria, knockout of this gene show growth restriction similar to mutants lacking the ability to produce K_{1}.

=== Function in other bacteria ===
Many bacteria, including Escherichia coli found in the large intestine, can synthesize vitamin K_{2} (MK-7 up to MK-11), but not vitamin K_{1}. In the vitamin K_{2} (menaquinone)–synthesizing bacteria, menaquinone transfers two electrons between two different small molecules during oxygen-independent metabolic energy production processes (anaerobic respiration). For example, a small molecule with an excess of electrons (also called an electron donor) such as lactate, formate, or NADH, with the help of an enzyme, passes two electrons to menaquinone. The menaquinone, with the help of another enzyme, then transfers these two electrons to a suitable oxidant, such as fumarate or nitrate (also called an electron acceptor). Adding two electrons to fumarate or nitrate converts the molecule to succinate or nitrite plus water, respectively.

Some of these reactions generate a cellular energy source, ATP, in a manner similar to eukaryotic cell aerobic respiration, except the final electron acceptor is not molecular oxygen, but fumarate or nitrate. In aerobic respiration, the final oxidant is molecular oxygen, which accepts four electrons from an electron donor such as NADH to be converted to water. E. coli, as facultative anaerobes, can carry out both aerobic respiration and menaquinone-mediated anaerobic respiration.

== History ==
In 1929, Danish scientist Henrik Dam investigated the role of cholesterol by feeding chickens a cholesterol-depleted diet. He initially replicated experiments reported by scientists at the Ontario Agricultural College. McFarlane, Graham and Richardson, working on the chick feed program at OAC, used chloroform to remove all fat from chick chow. They noticed that chicks fed only fat-depleted chow developed hemorrhages and started bleeding from tag sites. Dam found that these defects could not be restored by adding purified cholesterol to the diet. It appeared that – together with the cholesterol – a second compound was extracted from the food, and this compound was called the coagulation vitamin. The new vitamin received the letter K because the initial discoveries were reported in a German journal, in which it was designated as Koagulationsvitamin. Edward Adelbert Doisy of Saint Louis University did much of the research that led to the discovery of the structure and chemical nature of vitamin K. Dam and Doisy shared the 1943 Nobel Prize for medicine for their work on vitamin K_{1} and K_{2} published in 1939. Several laboratories synthesized the compound(s) in 1939.

For several decades, the vitamin K–deficient chick model was the only method of quantifying vitamin K in various foods: the chicks were made vitamin K–deficient and subsequently fed with known amounts of vitamin K–containing food. The extent to which blood coagulation was restored by the diet was taken as a measure for its vitamin K content. Three groups of physicians independently found this: Biochemical Institute, University of Copenhagen (Dam and Johannes Glavind), University of Iowa Department of Pathology (Emory Warner, Kenneth Brinkhous, and Harry Pratt Smith), and the Mayo Clinic (Hugh Butt, Albert Snell, and Arnold Osterberg).

The first published report of successful treatment with vitamin K of life-threatening hemorrhage in a jaundiced patient with prothrombin deficiency was made in 1938 by Smith, Warner, and Brinkhous.

The precise function of vitamin K was not discovered until 1974, when prothrombin, a blood coagulation protein, was confirmed to be vitamin K dependent. When the vitamin is present, prothrombin has amino acids near the amino terminus of the protein as γ-carboxyglutamate instead of glutamate, and is able to bind calcium, part of the clotting process.

== Research ==
=== Osteoporosis ===
Vitamin K is required for the gamma-carboxylation of osteocalcin in bone. The risk of osteoporosis, assessed via bone mineral density and fractures, was not affected for people on warfarin therapy – a vitamin K antagonist. Studies investigating whether vitamin K supplementation reduces risk of bone fractures have shown mixed results.

=== Cardiovascular health ===
Matrix Gla protein is a vitamin K-dependent protein found in bone, but also in soft tissues such as arteries, where it appears to function as an anti-calcification protein. In animal studies, animals that lack the gene for MGP exhibit calcification of arteries and other soft tissues. In humans, Keutel syndrome is a rare recessive genetic disorder associated with abnormalities in the gene coding for MGP and characterized by abnormal diffuse cartilage calcification. These observations led to a theory that in humans, inadequately carboxylated MGP, due to low dietary intake of the vitamin, could result in increased risk of arterial calcification and coronary heart disease.

In meta-analyses of population studies, low intake of vitamin K was associated with inactive MGP, arterial calcification and arterial stiffness. Lower dietary intakes of vitamin K_{1} and vitamin K_{2} were also associated with higher coronary heart disease. When blood concentration of circulating vitamin K_{1} was assessed there was an increased risk in all cause mortality linked to low concentration. In contrast to these population studies, a review of randomized trials using supplementation with either vitamin K_{1} or vitamin K_{2} reported no role in mitigating vascular calcification or reducing arterial stiffness. The trials were too short to assess any impact on coronary heart disease or mortality.

=== Other ===
Population studies suggest that vitamin K status may have roles in inflammation, brain function, endocrine function and an anti-cancer effect. For all of these, there is not sufficient evidence from intervention trials to draw any conclusions. From a review of observational trials, long-term use of vitamin K antagonists as anticoagulation therapy is associated with lower cancer incidence in general. There are conflicting reviews as to whether agonists reduce the risk of prostate cancer.
