= Vitamin K2 =

Group of vitamins and bacterial metabolites

General structure of vitamin K_{2} (MK-n)

Vitamin K_{2} or menaquinone (MK) (/ˌmɛnəˈkwɪnoʊn/) is one of three types of vitamin K, the other two being vitamin K_{1} (phylloquinone) and K_{3} (menadione). K_{2} is both a tissue and bacterial product (derived from vitamin K_{1} in both cases) and is usually found in animal products or fermented foods.

The number n of isoprenyl units in their side chain differs and ranges from 4 to 13, hence vitamin K_{2} consists of various forms. It is indicated as a suffix (-n), e. g. MK-7 or MK-9.

- The most common in the human diet is the short-chain, water-soluble menatetrenone (MK-4), which is commonly found in animal products. However, at least one published study concluded that "MK-4 present in food does not contribute to the vitamin K status as measured by serum vitamin K levels." The MK-4 in animal (including human) tissue is made from dietary plant vitamin K_{1}. This process can be accomplished by animal tissues alone, as it proceeds in germ-free rodents.
- Long-chain menaquinones (longer than MK-4) include MK-7, MK-8 and MK-9 and are more predominant in fermented foods such as natto and cheonggukjang. They are bioavailable: oral consumption of MK-7 "significantly increases serum MK-7 levels and therefore may be of particular importance for extrahepatic tissues".
- Longer-chain menaquinones (MK-10 to MK-13) are produced by anaerobic bacteria in the colon, but they are not well absorbed at this level and have little physiological impact.

When there are no isoprenyl side chain units, the remaining molecule is vitamin K_{3}. This is usually made synthetically, and is used in animal feed. It was formerly given to premature infants, but due to inadvertent toxicity in the form of hemolytic anemia and jaundice, it is no longer used for this purpose. K_{3} is now known to be a circulating intermediate in the animal production of MK-4: K_{1} is absorbed into the gut and converted into blood K_{3} and target tissues convert K_{3} into MK-4.

== Description ==
Vitamin K_{2}, the main storage form in animals, has several subtypes, which differ in isoprenoid chain length. These vitamin K_{2} homologues are called menaquinones, and are characterized by the number of isoprenoid residues in their side chains. Menaquinones are abbreviated MK-n, where M stands for menaquinone, the K stands for vitamin K, and the n represents the number of isoprenoid side chain residues. For example, menaquinone-4 (abbreviated MK-4) has four isoprene residues in its side chain. Menaquinone-4 (also known as menatetrenone from its four isoprene residues) is the most common type of vitamin K_{2} in animal products since MK-4 is normally synthesized from vitamin K_{1} in certain animal tissues (arterial walls, pancreas, and testes) by replacement of the phytyl tail with an unsaturated geranylgeranyl tail containing four isoprene units, thus yielding menaquinone-4 which is water soluble in nature. This homolog of vitamin K_{2} may have enzyme functions distinct from those of vitamin K_{1}.

MK-7 and other long-chain menaquinones are different from MK-4 in that they are not produced by human tissue. MK-7 may be converted from phylloquinone (K_{1}) in the colon by Escherichia coli bacteria. However, these menaquinones synthesized by bacteria in the gut appear to contribute minimally to overall vitamin K status. MK-4 and MK-7 are both found in the United States in dietary supplements for bone health.

All K vitamins are similar in structure: they share a "quinone" ring, but differ in the length and degree of saturation of the carbon tail and the number of repeating isoprene units in the "side chain". The number of repeating units is indicated in the name of the particular menaquinone (e.g., MK-4 means that four isoprene units are repeated in the carbon tail). The chain length influences lipid solubility and thus transport to different target tissues.

Vitamin K structures. MK-4 and MK-7 are both subtypes of K_{2}.

== Mechanism of action ==
The mechanism of action of vitamin K_{2} is similar to vitamin K_{1}. K vitamins were first recognized as a factor required for coagulation, but the functions performed by this vitamin group were revealed to be much more complex. K vitamins play an essential role as cofactor for the enzyme γ-glutamyl carboxylase, which is involved in vitamin K-dependent carboxylation of the gla domain in "gla proteins" (i.e., in conversion of peptide-bound glutamic acid (glu) to γ-carboxyglutamic acid (Gla) in these proteins).

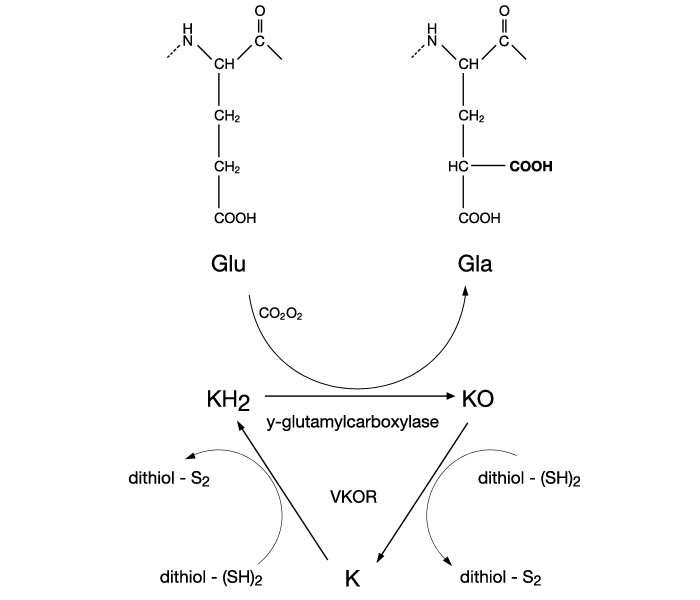
Carboxylation reaction – the vitamin K cycle

Carboxylation of these vitamin K-dependent Gla-proteins, besides being essential for the function of the protein, is also an important vitamin recovery mechanism since it serves as a recycling pathway to recover vitamin K from its epoxide metabolite (KO) for reuse in carboxylation.

Several human Gla-containing proteins synthesized in several different types of tissue have been discovered:

- Coagulation factors (II, VII, IX, X), as well as anticoagulation proteins (C, S, Z). These Gla-proteins are synthesized in the liver and play an important role in blood homeostasis.
- Osteocalcin. This non-collagenous protein is secreted by osteoblasts and plays an essential role in the formation of mineral in bone.
- Matrix gla protein (MGP). This calcification inhibitory protein is found in numerous body tissues, but its role is most pronounced in cartilage and in arterial vessel walls.
- Growth arrest-specific protein 6 (GAS6). GAS6 is secreted by leucocytes and endothelial cells in response to injury and helps in cell survival, proliferation, migration, and adhesion.
- Proline-rich Gla-proteins (PRGP), transmembrane Gla-proteins (TMG), Gla-rich protein (GRP) and periostin. Their precise functions are still unknown.

== Health effects ==
There is inconclusive clinical data whether specific vitamin K2 supplementation confers any beneficial effects compared to vitamin K1 which is the most common form in supplements. In vitro studies show certain cellular effects of vitamin K2 in bone which are not observed with the K1 variant (including bone marrow stem cell (BMSC) proliferation, and stimulation of osteoblast differentiation). The effects of vitamin K2 appear to be accentuated when combined with vitamin D and in the setting of osteoporosis.

== Absorption profile ==
Vitamin K is absorbed along with dietary fat from the small intestine and transported by chylomicrons in the circulation. Most vitamin K_{1} is carried by triacylglycerol-rich lipoproteins (TRL) and rapidly cleared by the liver; only a small amount is carried by LDL and HDL. MK-4 is carried by the same lipoproteins (TRL, LDL, and HDL) and cleared rapidly as well. The long-chain menaquinones are absorbed in the same way as vitamin K_{1} and MK-4 but are redistributed predominantly in LDL. Since LDL has a long half-life in the circulation, these menaquinones can circulate for extended periods, potentially increasing their availability to extrahepatic tissues compared with vitamin K_{1} and MK-4. Accumulation of vitamin K in extrahepatic tissues has direct relevance to vitamin K functions not related to hemostasis.

== Dietary intake in humans ==
The European Food Safety Authority (EU) and the US Institute of Medicine, on reviewing existing evidence, have decided there is insufficient evidence to publish a dietary reference value for vitamin K or for K_{2}. They have, however, published an Adequate Intake (AI) for vitamin K, but no value specifically for K_{2}.

Parts of the scientific literature, dating back to 1998, suggest that the AI values are based only on the hepatic requirements (i.e. related to the liver). This hypothesis is supported by the fact that the majority of the Western population exhibits a substantial fraction of undercarboxylated extra-hepatic proteins. Thus, complete activation of coagulation factors is satisfied, but there does not seem to be enough vitamin K_{2} for the carboxylation of osteocalcin in bone and MGP in the vascular system.

There is no known toxicity associated with high doses of menaquinones (vitamin K_{2}). Unlike the other fat-soluble vitamins, vitamin K is not stored in any significant quantity in the liver. All data available as of 2017 demonstrate that vitamin K has no adverse effects in healthy subjects. The recommendations for the daily intake of vitamin K, as issued recently by the US Institute of Medicine, also acknowledge the wide safety margin of vitamin K: "a search of the literature revealed no evidence of toxicity associated with the intake of either K_{1} or K_{2}". Animal models involving rats, if generalisable to humans, show that MK-7 is well tolerated.

== Dietary sources ==
Apart from animal livers, the richest dietary source of menaquinones are fermented foods (from bacteria, not molds or yeasts); sources include cheeses consumed in Western diets (e.g., containing MK-9, MK-10, and MK-11) and fermented soybean products (e.g., in traditional nattō consumed in Japan, containing MK-7 and MK-8). (Here and following it is noteworthy that most food assays measure only fully unsaturated menaquinones.)

MK-4 is synthesized by animal tissues and is found in meat, eggs, and dairy products. Cheeses have been found to contain MK-8 at 10–20 μg per 100 g and MK-9 at 35–55 μg per 100 g. In one report, no substantial differences in MK-4 levels were observed between wild game, free-range animals, and factory farm animals.

In addition to its animal origins, menaquinones are synthesized by bacteria during fermentation and so, as stated, are found in most fermented cheese and soybean products. As of 2001, the richest known source of natural K_{2} was nattō fermented using the nattō strain of Bacillus subtilis, which is reportedly a good source of long-chain MK-7. In nattō, MK-4 is absent as a form of vitamin K, and in cheeses it is present among the vitamins K only in low proportions. Still it is unknown whether B. subtilis will produce K_{2} using other legumes (e.g., chickpeas, or lentils) or even B. subtilis fermented oatmeal. According to Rebecca Rocchi et al., 2024, creating natto by using Bacillus subtilis to ferment boiled red lentils, chickpeas, or green peas produced greater amounts of MK-7 than creating natto by using Bacillus subtilis to ferment boiled soybeans, lupins, or brown beans.

Food frequency questionnaire-derived estimates of relative intakes of vitamins K in one northern European country suggest that for that population, about 90% of total vitamin K intakes are provided by K_{1}, about 7.5% by MK-5 through MK-9 and about 2.5% by MK-4

=== Analysis of foods ===
Food	Vitamin K_{2} (μg per 100 g or μg/100 ml)	Proportion of compounds
Nattō, fermented	1,034.0	0% MK-4, 1% MK-5, 1% MK-6, 90% MK-7, 8% MK-8
Goose liver pâté	369.0	100% MK-4
Hard cheeses (15 samples)	76.3	6% MK-4, 2% MK-5, 1% MK-6, 2% MK-7, 22% MK-8, 67% MK-9
Cheddar	23.5 (235 ng/g)	(ng/g) 51.2 MK-4, 3.8 MK-6, 18.8 MK-7, 36.4 MK-8, 125 MK-9
Eel	63.1	100% MK-4
Eel	2.2	1.7 MK-4, 0.1 MK-6, 0.4 MK-7
Soft cheeses (15 samples)	56.5	6.5% MK-4, 0.5% MK-5, 1% MK-6, 2% MK-7, 20% MK-8, 70% MK-9
Camembert	68.1 (681 ng/g)	(ng/g) 79.5 MK-4, 13.4 MK-5, 10.1 MK-6, 32.4 MK-7, 151 MK-8, 395 MK-9
Milk (4% fat, USA)†	38.1	2% MK-4, 46% MK-9, 7% MK-10, 45% MK-11
Egg yolk (Netherlands)	32.1	98% MK-4, 2% MK-6
Goose leg	31.0	100% MK-4
Curd cheeses (12 samples)	24.8	2.6% MK-4, 0.4% MK-5, 1% MK-6, 1% MK-7, 20% MK-8, 75% MK-9
Egg yolk (USA)	15.5	100% MK-4
Butter	15.0	100% MK-4
Chicken liver (pan-fried)	12.6	100% MK-4
Chicken leg	8.5	100% MK-4
Ground beef (medium fat)	8.1	100% MK-4
Calf's liver (pan-fried)	6.0	100% MK-4
Hot dog	5.7	100% MK-4
Bacon	5.6	100% MK-4
Whipping cream	5.4	100% MK-4
Sauerkraut	4.8	8% MK-4, 17% MK-5, 31% MK-6, 4% MK-7, 17% MK-8, 23% MK-9
Pork steak	3.7	57% MK-4, 13% MK-7, 30% MK-8
Duck breast	3.6	100% MK-4
Buttermilk	2.5	8% MK-4, 4% MK-5, 4% MK-6, 4% MK-7, 24% MK-8, 56% MK-9
Beef	1.1	100% MK-4
Buckwheat bread	1.1	100% MK-7
Whole milk yogurt	0.9	67% MK-4, 11% MK-5, 22% MK-8
Whole milk (Netherlands)†	0.9	89% MK-4, 11% MK-5
Egg white	0.9	100% MK-4
Salmon	0.5	100% MK-4
Cow's liver (pan-fried)	0.4	100% MK-4
Mackerel	0.4	100% MK-4
Skimmed milk yogurt	0.1	100% MK-8

Notes:

- † – The reported amounts in comparable milk from the USA and the Netherlands differ by more than 40 times, so these numbers should be considered suspect.

== Anticoagulants ==
Recent studies found a clear association between long-term oral (or intravenous) anticoagulant treatment (OAC) and reduced bone quality due to reduction of active osteocalcin. OAC might lead to an increased incidence of fractures, reduced bone mineral density or content, osteopenia, and increased serum levels of undercarboxylated osteocalcin.

Furthermore, OAC is often linked to undesired soft-tissue calcification in both children and adults. This process has been shown to be dependent upon the action of K vitamins. Vitamin K deficiency results in undercarboxylation of MGP. Also in humans on OAC treatment, two-fold more arterial calcification was found as compared to patients not receiving vitamin K antagonists. Among consequences of anticoagulant treatment: increased aortic wall stiffness, coronary insufficiency, ischemia, and even heart failure. Arterial calcification might also contribute to systolic hypertension and ventricular hypertrophy. Anticoagulant therapy is usually instituted to avoid life-threatening diseases, and high vitamin K intake interferes with anticoagulant effects. Patients on warfarin (Coumadin) or being treated with other vitamin K antagonists are therefore advised not to consume diets rich in K vitamins.

== In other organisms ==
Many bacteria synthesize menaquinones from chorismic acid. They use it as a part of the electron transport chain, playing a similar role as other quinones such as ubiquinone. Oxygen, heme, and menaquinones are needed for many species of lactic acid bacteria to conduct respiration.

Variations in biosynthetic pathways mean that bacteria also produce analogues of vitamin K_{2}. For example, MK9_{(II-H)}, which replaces the second geranylgeranyl unit with a saturated phytyl, is produced by Mycobacterium phlei. There also exists a possibility of cis–trans isomerism due to the double bonds present. In M. phlei, the 3'-methyl-cis MK9_{(II-H)} form seems to be more biologically active than trans MK9_{(II-H)}. However, with human enzymes, the naturally abundant trans form is more efficient.

One hydrogenated MK that sees relevant amounts of human consumption is MK-9(4H), found in cheese fermented by Propionibacterium freudenreichii. This variation has the second and third units replaced with phytyl.

== See also ==
- Vitamin K
- Vitamin K_{1}
- Vitamin K_{3}
