= Z-gene =

Z-gene or Z gene may refer to:

- lacZ, a gene in the lac operon
  - Beta-galactosidase, the type of protein encoded by lacZ
- Protein Z, a vitamin K-dependent glycoprotein involved in blood clotting
- ZW sex-determination system
