= Demethylmenaquinone methyltransferase =

Identifiers
- EC no.: 2.1.1.163

Databases
- IntEnz: IntEnz view
- BRENDA: BRENDA entry
- ExPASy: NiceZyme view
- KEGG: KEGG entry
- MetaCyc: metabolic pathway
- PRIAM: profile
- PDB structures: RCSB PDB PDBe PDBsum
Search
- PMC: articles
- PubMed: articles
- NCBI: proteins

Demethylmenaquinone methyltransferase (EC 2.1.1.163, S-adenosyl-L-methionine-DMK methyltransferase, demethylmenaquinone C-methylase, 2-heptaprenyl-1,4-naphthoquinone methyltransferase, 2-demethylmenaquinone methyltransferase, S-adenosyl-L-methionine:2-demethylmenaquinone methyltransferase) is an enzyme with systematic name S-adenosyl-L-methionine:demethylmenaquinone methyltransferase. This enzyme catalyses the following chemical reaction

demethylmenaquinol + S-adenosyl-L-methionine $\rightleftharpoons$ menaquinol + S-adenosyl-L-homocysteine

Menaquinone, the oxidised form of manaquinol

The enzyme catalyses the penultimate step in menaquinone biosynthesis.
