= 3-Hydroxyaspartic acid =

- L-threo-3-Hydroxyaspartate

Names
- Preferred IUPAC name (2S, 3Ξ)-2-Amino-3-hydroxybutanedioic acid
- Other names (2S, 3Ξ)-2-Amino-3-hydroxysuccinic acid 3-Hydroxyaspartic acid Beta-hydroxyaspartic acid

Identifiers
CAS Number	1860-87-3
3D model (JSmol)	Interactive image; Interactive image
ChEBI	CHEBI:10696
ChemSpider	391503
IUPHAR/BPS	4497
KEGG	C11511
PubChem CID	443239
UNII	99A78V5YX2
CompTox Dashboard (EPA)	DTXSID301017241
- InChI: InChI=1S/C4H7NO5/c5-1(3(7)8)2(6)4(9)10/h1-2,6H,5H2,(H,7,8)(H,9,10)/t1-,2-/m0/s1 Key: YYLQUHNPNCGKJQ-LWMBPPNESA-N; InChI=1/C4H7NO5/c5-1(3(7)8)2(6)4(9)10/h1-2,6H,5H2,(H,7,8)(H,9,10)/t1-,2-/m0/s1 Key: YYLQUHNPNCGKJQ-LWMBPPNEBT
- SMILES: C(C(C(=O)O)O)(C(=O)O)N; O=C(O)[C@@H](N)[C@H](O)C(=O)O

Properties
Chemical formula	C_{4}H_{7}NO_{5}
Molar mass	149.102 g·mol^{−1}
- Except where otherwise noted, data are given for materials in their standard state (at 25 °C [77 °F], 100 kPa). verify (what is ?) Infobox references

3-Hydroxyaspartic acid (three letter abbreviation: Hya), also known as beta-hydroxyaspartic acid, is a derivative of aspartic acid which has been hydroxylated at position C3. The conjugated acid of 3-hydroxyaspartic acid is 3-hydroxyaspartate. The adjacent image shows L-threo-3-hydroxyaspartate.

== Structure ==
Similarly to proteinogenic isoleucine and threonine, 3-hydroxyaspartic acid contains two chiral centers. As such, it can exist in 4 stereoisomers, which form two pairs of enantiomers.

Isomers of 3-hydroxyaspartate

== Function ==
The Hya amino acid residue is sometimes contained in EGF-like domains such as Vitamin K-dependent coagulation plasma proteins including protein C.

D-threo-3-Hydroxyaspartate is a part of the siderophore ornibactin.

== See also ==
- Epidermal growth factor (EGF)
- Vitamin K-dependent protein
