= 1,4-dihydroxy-2-naphthoate polyprenyltransferase =

Class of enzymes

Identifiers
- EC no.: 2.5.1.74

Databases
- IntEnz: IntEnz view
- BRENDA: BRENDA entry
- ExPASy: NiceZyme view
- KEGG: KEGG entry
- MetaCyc: metabolic pathway
- PRIAM: profile
- PDB structures: RCSB PDB PDBe PDBsum
Search
- PMC: articles
- PubMed: articles
- NCBI: proteins

1-4-dihydroxy-2-napthoate (DHNA) polyprenyltransferase (EC 2.5.1.74) is an enzyme that catalyzes the chemical reaction: all-trans-nonaprenyl diphosphate + 1-4-dihydroxy-2-napthoate + H+ $\rightleftharpoons$ demethylmenaquinol-9 + diphosphate + carbon dioxide

Hence, the 3 substrates of this enzyme are all-trans-nonaprenyl diphosphate, 1-4-dihydroxy-2-napthoate, and a hydrogen ion, and the three products are demethylmenaquinol-9, diphosphate, and carbon dioxide. However, other substrates this enzyme can use include farnesyl diphosphate or solanesyl diphosphate in replacement of all-trans-nonaprenyl diphosphate.

1-4-dihydroxy-2-napthoate polyprenyltransferase is located at 88 min on the E. coli chromosome while the rest of the genes responsible for the synthesis of menaquinone (Vitamin K) are clustered at 51 min.

This enzyme belongs to the transferase family, specifically transferring alkyl or aryl groups other than methyl groups. Other names for the enzyme include 1-4-dihydroxy-2-napthoate octaprenyltransferase, 1-4-dihydroxy-2-napthoate monoprenyltransferase, and MenA.

== Function ==
1-4-dihydroxy-2-napthoate polyprenyltransferase is the 8th out of 9 steps in the biosynthesis of menaquinone (Vitamin K), specifically demethylmenaquinol-9 within E. coli. Vitamin K is a cofactor vital for living and functions as one electron transporter in photosynthesis as a redox molecule. The reactions this enzyme catalyzes works by taking the soluble bicyclic naphthalenoid compound DHNA and converting it into demethylmenaquinone-9 by attaching a 40 carbon side chain to DHNA. However, this enzyme is unique in the sense that it can put different lengths of carbon side chains onto DHNA to produce different demethylmenaquinols and menaquinols.

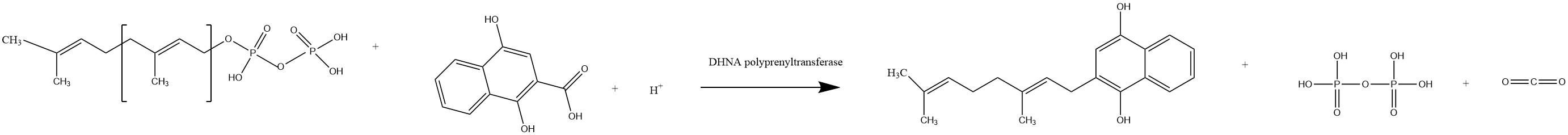

Other organisms that contain this pathway include Micrococcus luterus and Mycobacterium tuberculosis.

== Inhibitors and activators ==
Both E. coli and Micrococcus luterus require Mg^{2+} to work and a pH of 7 in Micrococcus luterus is optimal. EDTA is also an activating compound for the enzyme in Micrococcus luterus at an optimal concentration of 5mM but once it reaches 20mM it becomes an inhibitor and Mg^{2+}is required to reactivate it.

Enzyme Inhibitors	Organism
(R)-1-(4-((3-((4-chlorophenyl)(methoxyimino)methyl)phenoxy)-methyl)piperidin-1-yl)octan-2-yl carbamate	Mycobacterium tuberculosis
(R)-1-(4-((3-(4-chlorobenzoyl)phenoxy)methyl)piperidin-1-yl)-octan-2-yl carbamate	Mycobacterium tuberculosis
(S)-(2-chloro-4-((1-(2-hydroxyoctyl)piperidin-4-yl)methoxy)-phenyl)(4-chlorophenyl)methanone	Mycobacterium tuberculosis
(S)-1-(4-((3-chloro-4-((4-chlorophenyl)(methoxyimino)methyl)-phenoxy)methyl)piperidin-1-yl)octan-2-yl carbamate	Mycobacterium tuberculosis
(S)-1-(4-((3-chloro-4-(4-chlorobenzoyl)phenoxy)methyl)-piperidin-1-yl)octan-2-yl carbamate	Mycobacterium tuberculosis
Ca^{2+}	Micrococcus luterus
EDTA	Micrococcus luterus

== Location ==
The location of 1-4-dihydroxy-2-napthoate polyprenyltransferase is within the membrane.

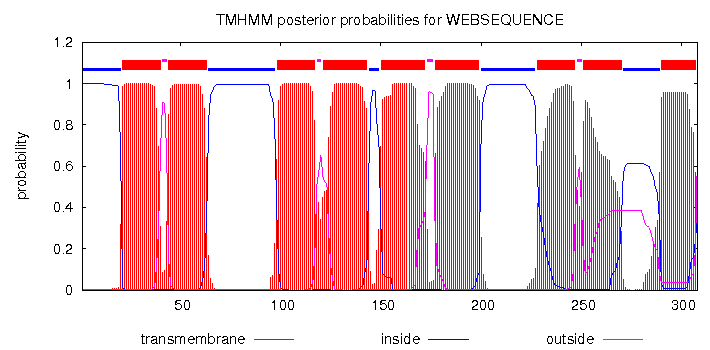
Transmembrane domain plot of DHNA polyprenyltransferase showing what parts of the domain are inside and outside of the membrane of a cell.
