= C6H9NO6 =

The molecular formula C_{6}H_{9}NO_{6} (molar mass: 191.14 g/mol) may refer to:

- Carboxyglutamic acid
- Isosorbide mononitrate
- Nitrilotriacetic acid
