= Nitric oxide reductase (menaquinol) =

Identifiers
- EC no.: 1.7.5.2

Databases
- IntEnz: IntEnz view
- BRENDA: BRENDA entry
- ExPASy: NiceZyme view
- KEGG: KEGG entry
- MetaCyc: metabolic pathway
- PRIAM: profile
- PDB structures: RCSB PDB PDBe PDBsum
Search
- PMC: articles
- PubMed: articles
- NCBI: proteins

Nitric oxide reductase (menaquinol) (EC 1.7.5.2) is an enzyme. This enzyme catalyses the following chemical reaction

2 nitric oxide + menaquinol $\rightleftharpoons$ nitrous oxide + menaquinone + H_{2}O

Nitric oxide reductase contains copper.

In 2015 the laboratory that had characterized the Bacillus azotoformans enzyme wrote, "The copper-A-dependent Nor from Bacillus azotoformans uses cytochrome c_{551} as electron donor but lacks menaquinol activity, in contrast to our earlier report."
