= MK7 =

MK7 may refer to:

- An English postcode area
- MK vitamin K2, Menaquinone
- Mortal Kombat: Armageddon, a video game
- Mario Kart 7, a video game
