= Nano-interfaces in bone =

Structural bones

The nano-interfaces in bone are the interface between individual collagen fibrils. The interface is filled with non-collagenous proteins, mainly osteopontin (OPN) and osteocalcin (OC). The osteopontin and osteocalcin form a sandwich structure with HAP minerals at nano-scale. The nano interfaces are less than 2 – 3 % of bone content by weight, while they add more than 30% of the fracture toughness.

== Introduction ==
Bones are the skeleton of our bodies. They allow us the ability to move and lift our body up against gravity. Bones are attachment points for muscles that help us to do many activities such as walking, jumping, kneeling, grasping, etc. Bones also protect organs from injury. Moreover, bone is responsible for blood cell production in a humans body.

The mechanical properties of bone greatly influence the functionality of bone. For instance, deterioration in bone ductility due to diseases such as osteoporosis can adversely affect individuals’ life. Bone ductility can show how much energy bone absorbs before fracture. In bone, the origin ductility is at the nanoscale.

== Deformation mechanisms in nano interfaces ==
The current knowledge of the structure and deformation mechanisms in nano-interfaces is limited. For the first time, a study unravel the complex synergic deformation mechanism in the nano-interfaces in bone. A synergistic deformation mechanism of the proteins through strong anchoring and formation of dynamic binding sites on mineral nano-platelets were seen. The nano-interface can sustain a ductility approaching 5000% and outstanding specific energy to failure that is several times larger than the most known tough natural materials such as spider silk.
