= Matrix Gla protein =

Protein-coding gene in the species Homo sapiens

MGP

Identifiers
- Aliases: MGP, MGLAP, NTI, GIG36, matrix Gla protein
- External IDs: OMIM: 154870; MGI: 96976; GeneCards: MGP

Gene location (Human)
Chr.	Chromosome 12 (human)
Band	12p12.3	Start	14,880,864 bp
Band	12p12.3	End	14,885,857 bp

Gene location (Mouse)
Chr.	Chromosome 6 (mouse)
Band	6|6 G1	Start	136,849,433 bp
Band	6|6 G1	End	136,852,821 bp
RNA expression pattern
Bgee	Human / Mouse (ortholog); Top expressed in: Descending thoracic aorta; ascending aorta; right coronary artery; left coronary artery; tibial arteries; left uterine tube; lactiferous duct; pericardium; saphenous vein; Achilles tendon / Top expressed in: tunica media of zone of aorta; right lung lobe; gastrula; aortic valve; carotid body; left lung; calvaria; ascending aorta; left lung lobe; superior surface of tongue; More reference expression data
BioGPS	n/a
Gene ontology
Molecular function	calcium ion binding; extracellular matrix structural constituent; protein binding; structural constituent of bone
Cellular component	extracellular matrix; extracellular region; extracellular exosome; collagen-containing extracellular matrix
Biological process	multicellular organism development; cell differentiation; cartilage development; cartilage condensation; ossification; regulation of bone mineralization
Sources:Amigo / QuickGO
Orthologs
Databases	NCBI: entry; OMA: entry
Species	Human	Mouse
Entrez	4256	17313
Ensembl	ENSG00000111341	ENSMUSG00000030218
UniProt	P08493	P19788
RefSeq (mRNA)	NM_001190839; NM_000900	NM_008597
RefSeq (protein)	NP_000891; NP_001177768	NP_032623
Location (UCSC)	Chr 12: 14.88 – 14.89 Mb	Chr 6: 136.85 – 136.85 Mb
PubMed search
- Wikidata
View/Edit Human	View/Edit Mouse

Matrix Gla protein (MGP) is member of a family of vitamin K_{2} dependent, Gla-containing proteins. MGP has a high affinity binding to calcium ions, similar to other Gla-containing proteins. The protein acts as an inhibitor of vascular mineralization and plays a role in bone organization.

MGP is found in a number of body tissues in mammals, birds, and fish. Its mRNA is present in bone, cartilage, heart, and kidney.

It is present in bone together with the related vitamin K2-dependent protein osteocalcin. In bone, its production is increased by vitamin D.

== Genetics ==
The MGP was linked to the short arm of chromosome 12 in 1990. Its mRNA sequence length is 585 bases long in humans.

== Physiology ==
MGP and osteocalcin are both calcium-binding proteins that may participate in the organisation of bone tissue. Both have glutamate residues that are post-translationally carboxylated by the enzyme gamma-glutamyl carboxylase in a reaction that requires Vitamin K hydroquinone.

== Role in disease ==
Abnormalities in the MGP gene have been linked with Keutel syndrome, a rare condition characterised by abnormal calcium deposition in cartilage, peripheral stenosis of the pulmonary artery, and midfacial hypoplasia.

Mice that lack MGP develop to term but die within two months as a result of arterial calcification which leads to blood-vessel rupture.
