= Keutel syndrome =

- Other names: Pulmonic stenosis-brachytelephalangism-calcification of cartilages syndrome
- Keutel syndrome has an autosomal recessive pattern of inheritance.

Keutel syndrome (KS) is a rare autosomal recessive genetic disorder characterized by abnormal diffuse cartilage calcification, hypoplasia of the mid-face, peripheral pulmonary stenosis, hearing loss, short distal phalanges (tips) of the fingers and mild mental retardation. Individuals with KS often present with peripheral pulmonary stenosis, brachytelephalangism, sloping forehead, midface hypoplasia, and receding chin. It is associated with abnormalities in the gene coding for matrix gla protein, MGP. Being an autosomal recessive disorder, it may be inherited from two unaffected, abnormal MGP-carrying parents. Thus, people who inherit two affected MGP alleles will likely inherit KS.

It was first identified in 1972 as a novel rare genetic disorder sharing similar symptoms with chondrodysplasia punctata. Multiple forms of chondrodysplasia punctata share symptoms consistent with KS including abnormal cartilage calcification, forceful respiration, brachytelephalangism, hypotonia, psychomotor delay, and conductive deafness, yet peripheral pulmonary stenosis remains unique to KS.

No chromosomal abnormalities are reported in affected individuals, suggesting that familial consanguinity relates to the autosomal recessive mode of inheritance. Also, despite largely abnormal calcification of regions including the larynx, tracheobronchial tree, nose, pinna (anatomy), and epiglottis, patients exhibit normal serum calcium and phosphate levels.

== Signs and symptoms ==
Being an extremely rare autosomal genetic disorder, differential diagnosis has only led to several cases since 1972. Initial diagnosis lends itself to facial abnormalities including sloping forehead, maxillary hypoplasia, nasal bridge depression, wide mouth, dental malocclusion, and receding chin. Electroencephalography (EEG), computed tomography (CT) scanning, and skeletal survey are further required for confident diagnosis. Commonly, diffuse cartilage calcification and brachytelephalangism are identified by X-radiation (X-ray), while peripheral pulmonary arterial stenosis, hearing loss, dysmorphic facies, and mental retardation are confirmed with confidence by the aforementioned diagnostic techniques.

=== Skeletal effects ===
Diagnosis is often confirmed by several abnormalities of skeletal origin. There is a sequential order of findings, according to Cormode et al., which initiate in abnormal cartilage calcification and later brachytelephalangism. The uniqueness of brachytelephalangy in KS results in distinctively broadened and shortened first through fourth distal phalanges, while the fifth distal phalanx bone remains unaffected. Radiography also reveals several skeletal anomalies including facial hypoplasia resulting in underdevelopment of the nasal bridge with noticeably diminished alae nasi. In addition to distinguishable facial features, patients generally demonstrate shorter than average stature and general mild developmental delay.

=== Cartilaginous effects ===
Many common effects sharing similarity with chondrodysplasia punctata stem from cartilaginous origin. Radiography reveals extensive diffuse cartilaginous calcification. Pulmonary angiography and soft tissue radiography often demonstrate significant cartilaginous ossification in the trachea and larynx, with perichondral and endochondral centers significantly ossified in transformed cartilage. Abnormal diffuse cartilaginous ossification is typically most pronounced in the auricles and cartilage of the trachea and larynx, while peripheral pulmonary stenosis is frequently common in KS. In consanguineous parents of children with KS, one is often phenotypically normal, while the other is positive for pulmonary stenosis. Perhaps emanating from diffuse laryngotracheal calcification, patients often present with recurrent respiratory infection, otitis media, and sinusitis.

=== Cardiovascular effects ===
Apart from diffuse abnormal cartilaginous calcification in pulmonary and wikt:otic systems, patients develop significant arterial calcification throughout the body. Such calcification is concomitant with various diseases including diabetes, atherosclerosis, and kidney dysfunction, while patients with oral anticoagulant use have significant aortic valve and coronary artery calcification. Although not distinctive to KS, echocardiogram analysis has revealed right ventricular hypertrophy resulting in severe pulmonary artery hypertension in several cases.

== Pathogenesis ==
Keutel syndrome is an autosomal recessive disorder caused by a novel loss-of-function mutation in the matrix Gla protein gene (MGP). MGP protein resides in the extracellular matrix and is implicated in inhibiting calcification though the repression of bone morphogenetic protein 2 (BMP2). Mutations resulting in loss of consensus donor splice site at exon 2-intron 2 junctions result in significant diffuse calcification of soft tissue cartilage. Extensive diffuse cartilaginous calcification is present in MGP-knockout mice, manifesting in vascular media replacement with a cartilaginous, chondrocyte-like matrix, and ultimately premature death. Conversely, over expression of extracellular MGP effectively abolishes calcification in chondrocytes, suggesting that MGP may function in inhibiting passive calcification in soft tissues. Recent evidence suggests MGP is a vitamin K dependent protein synthesized by chondrocytes and vascular smooth muscle cells, where it potentiates the inhibition of cartilaginous and arterial calcification. Thus, potential vitamin K deficiency, via nutritional deficiency or coumarin-derivative use, would render MGP uncarboxylated and inactive, thus diminishing biological function. Arterial calcification resulting from MGP inactivation results in inimical prognosis, commonly seen in patients with diabetes, atherosclerosis, and renal dysfunction.

== Treatment ==
Treatment is symptomatic, often addressing indicators associated with peripheral pulmonary artery stenosis. Laryngotracheal calcification resulting in dyspnea and forceful breathing can be treated with bronchodilators including the short and long-acting β2-agonists, and various anticholinergics.

== Prognosis ==
Prognosis is good, yet life expectancy depends on the severity and extent of diffuse pulmonary and arterial calcification.

== History ==
Keutel Syndrom was first described by the pediatric Cardiologist Jürgen Keutel and Colleagues in 1972 in Göttingen, Germany.
