= TYRO3 =

Protein-coding gene in the species Homo sapiens

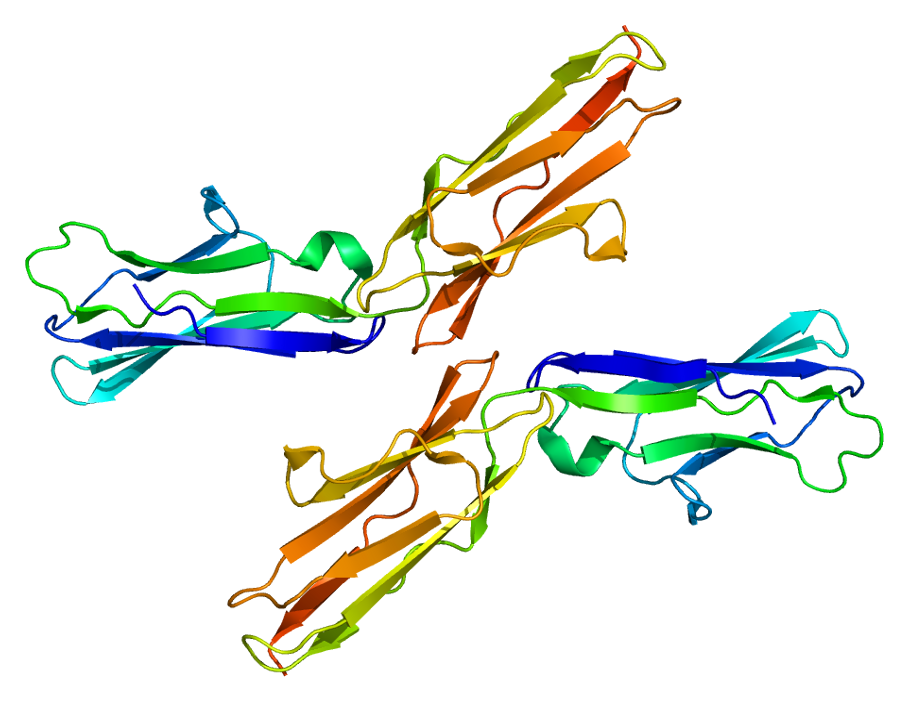

Identifiers
- Aliases: TYRO3, BYK, Dtk, RSE, Sky, Tif, Etk-2, Rek, TYRO3 protein tyrosine kinase
- External IDs: OMIM: 600341; MGI: 104294; GeneCards: TYRO3
Available structures
PDB	Ortholog search: PDBe RCSB
PDB	List of PDB id codes 1RHF
Enzyme activity
EC #	BRENDA	ExPASy	KEGG	MetaCyc
2.7.10.1	↗	↗	↗	↗

Gene location (Human)
Chr.	Chromosome 15 (human)
Band	15q15.1	Start	41,557,675 bp
Band	15q15.1	End	41,583,589 bp

Gene location (Mouse)
Chr.	Chromosome 2 (mouse)
Band	2 E5|2 59.97 cM	Start	119,628,214 bp
Band	2 E5|2 59.97 cM	End	119,648,585 bp
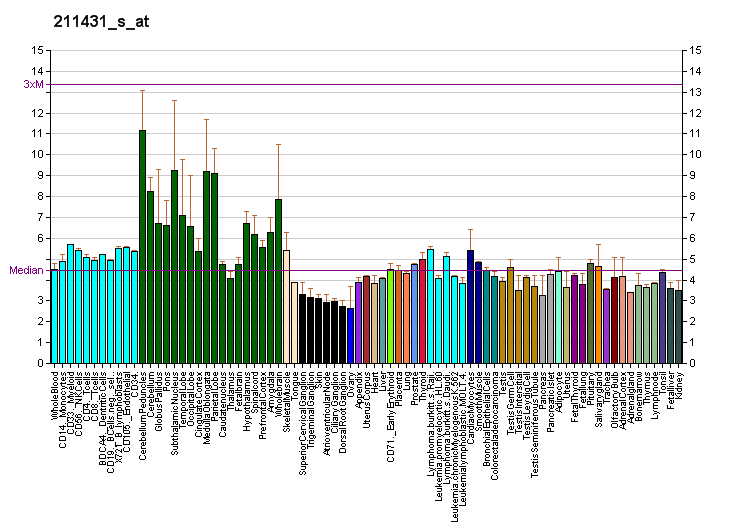

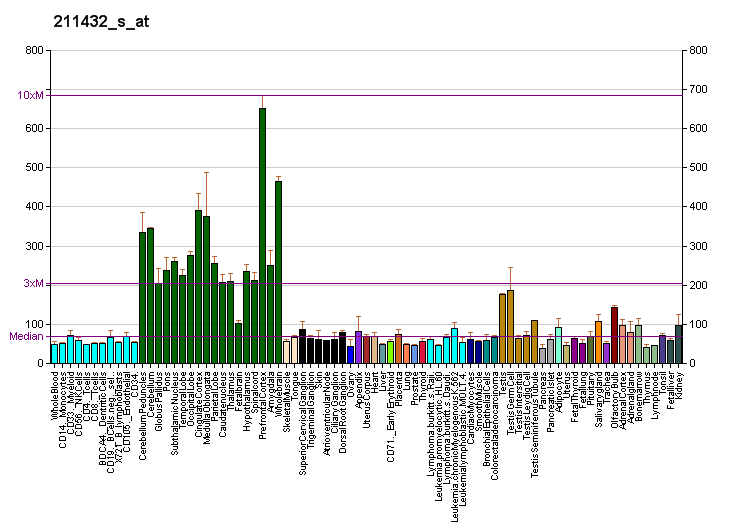
RNA expression pattern
Bgee	Human / Mouse (ortholog); Top expressed in: frontal pole; Brodmann area 10; paraflocculus of cerebellum; middle frontal gyrus; right hemisphere of cerebellum; right frontal lobe; Brodmann area 9; cerebellar vermis; C1 segment; cingulate gyrus / Top expressed in: primary motor cortex; perirhinal cortex; olfactory epithelium; piriform cortex; olfactory tubercle; superior frontal gyrus; entorhinal cortex; cingulate gyrus; prefrontal cortex; primary visual cortex; More reference expression data
BioGPS	More reference expression data
Gene ontology
Molecular function	transferase activity; nucleotide binding; protein kinase activity; virus receptor activity; kinase activity; phosphatidylinositol 3-kinase binding; protein binding; protein heterodimerization activity; ATP binding; protein tyrosine kinase activity; transmembrane receptor protein tyrosine kinase activity; receptor tyrosine kinase; transmembrane signaling receptor activity; Wnt-protein binding
Cellular component	integral component of membrane; nuclear envelope; endoplasmic reticulum membrane; membrane; plasma membrane; integral component of plasma membrane; nucleus; cell surface; cytoplasm; receptor complex
Biological process	vagina development; phosphorylation; negative regulation of lymphocyte activation; protein phosphorylation; viral entry into host cell; phosphatidylinositol 3-kinase signaling; protein autophosphorylation; viral process; signal transduction; natural killer cell differentiation; cell adhesion; negative regulation of innate immune response; spermatogenesis; platelet activation; forebrain cell migration; apoptotic cell clearance; substrate adhesion-dependent cell spreading; peptidyl-tyrosine phosphorylation; ovarian cycle; negative regulation of neuron apoptotic process; platelet aggregation; neuron cellular homeostasis; protein kinase B signaling; negative regulation of toll-like receptor signaling pathway; secretion by cell; negative regulation of inflammatory response; neuropeptide signaling pathway; negative regulation of signal transduction; Wnt signaling pathway; cell differentiation; negative regulation of apoptotic process; positive regulation of ERK1 and ERK2 cascade; transmembrane receptor protein tyrosine kinase signaling pathway
Sources:Amigo / QuickGO
Orthologs
Databases	NCBI: entry; OMA: entry
Species	Human	Mouse
Entrez	7301	22174
Ensembl	ENSG00000092445	ENSMUSG00000027298
UniProt	Q06418	P55144
RefSeq (mRNA)	NM_006293; NM_001330264	NM_001290800; NM_019392
RefSeq (protein)	NP_001317193; NP_006284	NP_001277729; NP_062265
Location (UCSC)	Chr 15: 41.56 – 41.58 Mb	Chr 2: 119.63 – 119.65 Mb
PubMed search
- Wikidata
View/Edit Human	View/Edit Mouse

Tyrosine-protein kinase receptor TYRO3 is an enzyme that in humans is encoded by the TYRO3 gene.

== Interactions ==
TYRO3 has been shown to interact with:

- GAS6, and
- PIK3R1
