= ITIH4 =

Protein-coding gene in the species Homo sapiens

Identifiers
- Aliases: ITIH4, GP120, H4P, IHRP, ITI-HC4, ITIHL1, PK-120, PK120, inter-alpha-trypsin inhibitor heavy chain family member 4, inter-alpha-trypsin inhibitor heavy chain 4
- External IDs: OMIM: 600564; MGI: 109536; HomoloGene: 1670; GeneCards: ITIH4; OMA:ITIH4 - orthologs

Gene location (Human)
Chr.	Chromosome 3 (human)
Band	3p21.1	Start	52,812,962 bp
Band	3p21.1	End	52,830,688 bp

Gene location (Mouse)
Chr.	Chromosome 14 (mouse)
Band	14 B|14 19.09 cM	Start	30,608,433 bp
Band	14 B|14 19.09 cM	End	30,624,310 bp
RNA expression pattern
Bgee	Human / Mouse (ortholog); Top expressed in: right lobe of liver; right coronary artery; popliteal artery; tibial arteries; left coronary artery; body of pancreas; muscle of thigh; sperm; right adrenal cortex; gastrocnemius muscle / Top expressed in: left lobe of liver; ascending aorta; aortic valve; gallbladder; tunica media of zone of aorta; right lung lobe; carotid body; sexually immature organism; fetal liver hematopoietic progenitor cell; embryo; More reference expression data
BioGPS	n/a
Gene ontology
Molecular function	peptidase inhibitor activity; endopeptidase inhibitor activity; protein binding; serine-type endopeptidase inhibitor activity
Cellular component	cytoplasm; plasma membrane; blood microparticle; extracellular exosome; platelet dense granule lumen; extracellular region; collagen-containing extracellular matrix
Biological process	response to cytokine; negative regulation of peptidase activity; acute-phase response; hyaluronan metabolic process; platelet degranulation; negative regulation of endopeptidase activity
Sources:Amigo / QuickGO
Orthologs
Species	Human	Mouse
Entrez	3700	16427
Ensembl	ENSG00000055955	ENSMUSG00000021922
UniProt	Q14624	A6X935
RefSeq (mRNA)	NM_002218; NM_001166449	NM_001159299; NM_001289632; NM_001289633; NM_018746
RefSeq (protein)	NP_001159921; NP_002209	NP_001152771; NP_001276561; NP_001276562; NP_061216
Location (UCSC)	Chr 3: 52.81 – 52.83 Mb	Chr 14: 30.61 – 30.62 Mb
PubMed search
- Wikidata
View/Edit Human	View/Edit Mouse

Inter-alpha-trypsin inhibitor heavy chain H4 is a protein that in humans is encoded by the ITIH4 gene.

== See also ==
- Inter-alpha-trypsin inhibitor
- ITIH1
- ITIH2
- ITIH3
