= ITIH2 =

Protein-coding gene in the species Homo sapiens

Identifiers
- Aliases: ITIH2, H2P, SHAP, inter-alpha-trypsin inhibitor heavy chain 2
- External IDs: OMIM: 146640; MGI: 96619; GeneCards: ITIH2

Gene location (Human)
Chr.	Chromosome 10 (human)
Band	10p14	Start	7,703,316 bp
Band	10p14	End	7,749,520 bp

Gene location (Mouse)
Chr.	Chromosome 2 (mouse)
Band	2 A1|2 6.89 cM	Start	10,099,404 bp
Band	2 A1|2 6.89 cM	End	10,136,207 bp
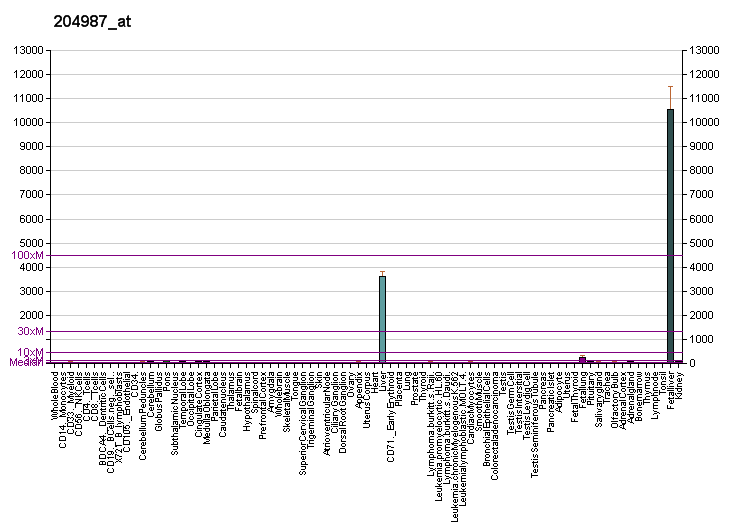
RNA expression pattern
Bgee	Human / Mouse (ortholog); Top expressed in: liver; right lobe of liver; testicle; Epithelium of choroid plexus; tibialis anterior muscle; cerebellar hemisphere; putamen; right hemisphere of cerebellum; prefrontal cortex; pancreatic ductal cell / Top expressed in: left lobe of liver; gallbladder; fetal liver hematopoietic progenitor cell; human fetus; vestibular membrane of cochlear duct; ankle joint; abdominal wall; sexually immature organism; ascending aorta; optic nerve; More reference expression data
BioGPS	More reference expression data
Gene ontology
Molecular function	peptidase inhibitor activity; endopeptidase inhibitor activity; serine-type endopeptidase inhibitor activity
Cellular component	blood microparticle; extracellular exosome; extracellular region; endoplasmic reticulum lumen; collagen-containing extracellular matrix
Biological process	hyaluronan metabolic process; negative regulation of peptidase activity; negative regulation of endopeptidase activity; post-translational protein modification
Sources:Amigo / QuickGO
Orthologs
Databases	NCBI: entry; OMA: entry
Species	Human	Mouse
Entrez	3698	16425
Ensembl	ENSG00000151655	ENSMUSG00000037254
UniProt	P19823	Q61703
RefSeq (mRNA)	NM_002216	NM_010582
RefSeq (protein)	NP_002207	NP_034712
Location (UCSC)	Chr 10: 7.7 – 7.75 Mb	Chr 2: 10.1 – 10.14 Mb
PubMed search
- Wikidata
View/Edit Human	View/Edit Mouse

Inter-alpha-trypsin inhibitor heavy chain H2 is a protein that in humans is encoded by the ITIH2 gene.

It is known to contain a Gla domain, and thus be dependent for production on post translational modification requiring vitamin K. Its function is also presumably dependent on calcium ions.

== See also ==
- Inter-alpha-trypsin inhibitor
- ITIH1
- ITIH3
- ITIH4
