= ITIH1 =

Protein-coding gene in the species Homo sapiens

Identifiers
- Aliases: ITIH1, H1P, IATIH, IGHEP1, ITI-HC1, ITIH, SHAP, inter-alpha-trypsin inhibitor heavy chain 1
- External IDs: OMIM: 147270; MGI: 96618; GeneCards: ITIH1

Gene location (Human)
Chr.	Chromosome 3 (human)
Band	3p21.1	Start	52,777,595 bp
Band	3p21.1	End	52,792,068 bp

Gene location (Mouse)
Chr.	Chromosome 14 (mouse)
Band	14|14 B	Start	30,651,137 bp
Band	14|14 B	End	30,665,246 bp
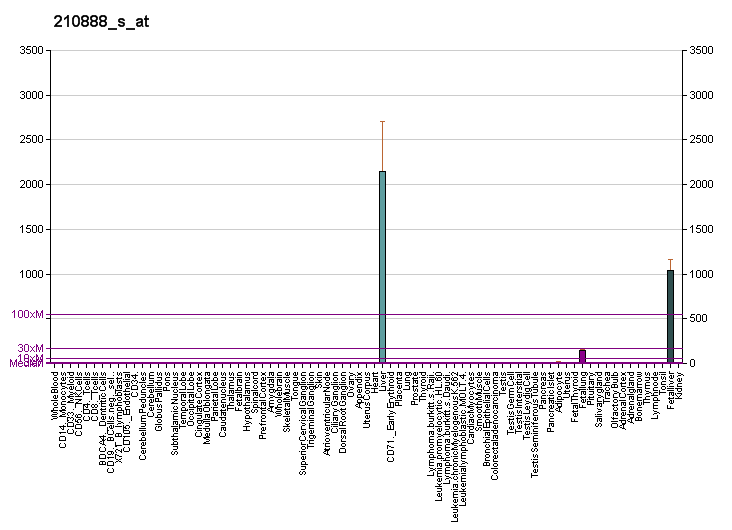
RNA expression pattern
Bgee	Human / Mouse (ortholog); Top expressed in: right lobe of liver; testicle; gonad; tibial arteries; right coronary artery; spleen; monocyte; left coronary artery; granulocyte; gallbladder / Top expressed in: left lobe of liver; ankle joint; proximal tubule; sexually immature organism; gallbladder; right kidney; yolk sac; thoracic diaphragm; right lobe of liver; medial head of gastrocnemius muscle; More reference expression data
BioGPS	More reference expression data
Gene ontology
Molecular function	peptidase inhibitor activity; calcium ion binding; serine-type endopeptidase inhibitor activity; protein binding
Cellular component	extracellular region; blood microparticle; extracellular exosome; collagen-containing extracellular matrix
Biological process	negative regulation of peptidase activity; negative regulation of endopeptidase activity; hyaluronan metabolic process
Sources:Amigo / QuickGO
Orthologs
Databases	NCBI: entry; OMA: entry
Species	Human	Mouse
Entrez	3697	16424
Ensembl	ENSG00000055957	ENSMUSG00000006529
UniProt	P19827	Q61702
RefSeq (mRNA)	NM_002215; NM_001166434; NM_001166435; NM_001166436	NM_008406; NM_001306078
RefSeq (protein)	NP_001159906; NP_001159907; NP_001159908; NP_002206	NP_001293007; NP_032432
Location (UCSC)	Chr 3: 52.78 – 52.79 Mb	Chr 14: 30.65 – 30.67 Mb
PubMed search
- Wikidata
View/Edit Human	View/Edit Mouse

Inter-alpha-trypsin inhibitor heavy chain H1 is a protein that in humans is encoded by the ITIH1 gene.

== See also ==
- Inter-alpha-trypsin inhibitor
- ITIH2
- ITIH3
- ITIH4
