= Ornibactin =

Chemical compound

Identifiers
- IUPAC name: (2R,3R)-4-[[(2S)-1-[[(2S)-1-(4-aminobutylamino)-5-[formyl(hydroxy)amino]-1-oxopentan-2-yl]amino]-3-hydroxy-1-oxopropan-2-yl]amino]-3-[[(2S)-2-amino-5-[hydroxy(3-hydroxyhexanoyl)amino]pentanoyl]amino]-2-hydroxy-4-oxobutanoic acid
- CAS Number: 154071-69-9
- PubChem CID: 102081710

Chemical and physical data
- Formula: C_{28}H_{52}N_{8}O_{13}
- Molar mass: 708.767 g·mol^{−1}
- 3D model (JSmol): Interactive image
- SMILES: CCCC(CC(=O)N(CCC[C@@H](C(=O)N[C@H]([C@H](C(=O)O)O)C(=O)N[C@@H](CO)C(=O)N[C@@H](CCCN(C=O)O)C(=O)NCCCCN)N)O)O
- InChI: InChI=1S/C28H52N8O13/c1-2-7-17(39)14-21(40)36(49)13-5-8-18(30)24(42)34-22(23(41)28(46)47)27(45)33-20(15-37)26(44)32-19(9-6-12-35(48)16-38)25(43)31-11-4-3-10-29/h16-20,22-23,37,39,41,48-49H,2-15,29-30H2,1H3,(H,31,43)(H,32,44)(H,33,45)(H,34,42)(H,46,47)/t17?,18-,19-,20-,22+,23+/m0/s1; Key:ZQCAUNGVEIYRKP-VCYWQZMXSA-N

Ornibactin is a siderophore, or small iron-binding compound secreted by bacteria to transport iron into the cell. Ornibactin is produced by Burkholderia cenocepacia under iron-deficient conditions. B. cenocepacia is known to opportunistically infect humans, specifically ones suffering from cystic fibrosis.

== Biosynthesis ==
Ornibactin consists of an L-ornithine-D-hydroxyaspartate-L-serine-L-ornithine backbone. It is biosynthesized by 2 non-ribosomal peptide synthetases (NRPSs), OrbI and OrbJ, as indicated in the figure below. The domains are as follows: adenylation (A), peptidyl carrier (P), condensation (C), and epimerase (E). The wavy lines in the figure indicate the phosphopantetheine arms to which the amino acid residues are attached via thioester linkages.

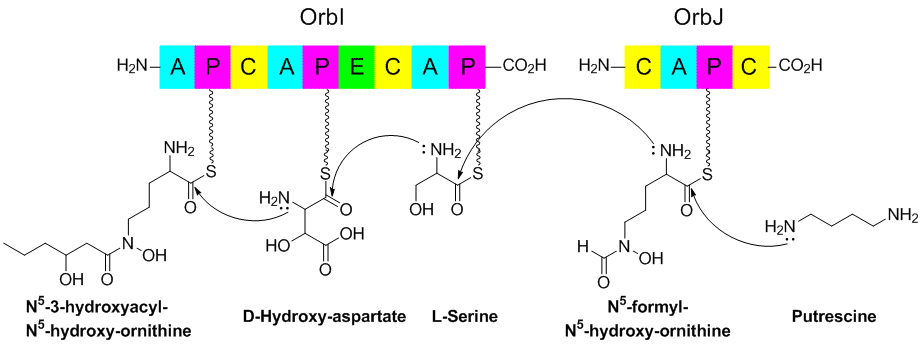
Biosynthesis of Ornibactin
