= ITIH3 =

Protein-coding gene in the species Homo sapiens

Identifiers
- Aliases: ITIH3, H3P, ITI-HC3, SHAP, inter-alpha-trypsin inhibitor heavy chain 3
- External IDs: OMIM: 146650; MGI: 96620; HomoloGene: 1669; GeneCards: ITIH3; OMA:ITIH3 - orthologs

Gene location (Human)
Chr.	Chromosome 3 (human)
Band	3p21.1	Start	52,794,768 bp
Band	3p21.1	End	52,809,009 bp

Gene location (Mouse)
Chr.	Chromosome 14 (mouse)
Band	14|14 B	Start	30,630,529 bp
Band	14|14 B	End	30,645,717 bp
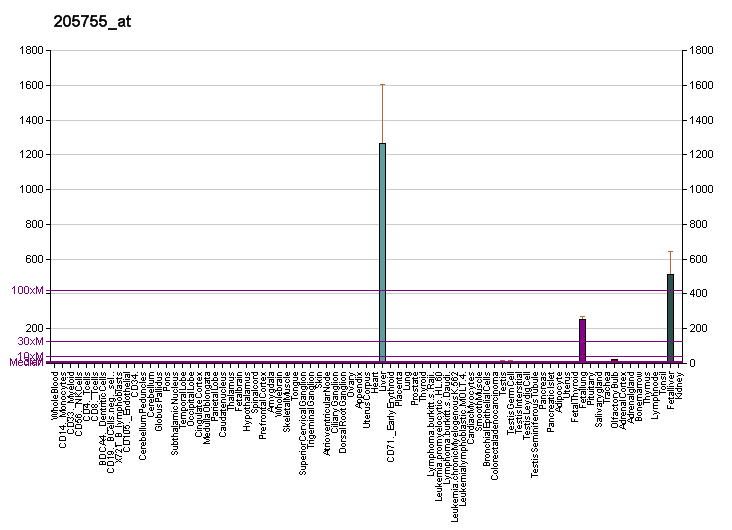
RNA expression pattern
Bgee	Human / Mouse (ortholog); Top expressed in: right lobe of liver; right coronary artery; popliteal artery; tibial arteries; left coronary artery; saphenous vein; tibial nerve; sural nerve; spleen; sperm / Top expressed in: ventromedial nucleus; left lobe of liver; dorsomedial hypothalamic nucleus; paraventricular nucleus of hypothalamus; lateral hypothalamus; arcuate nucleus; dorsal tegmental nucleus; mammillary body; ventral tegmental area; medial vestibular nucleus; More reference expression data
BioGPS	More reference expression data
Gene ontology
Molecular function	peptidase inhibitor activity; endopeptidase inhibitor activity; serine-type endopeptidase inhibitor activity; protein binding
Cellular component	extracellular exosome; platelet dense granule lumen; extracellular region
Biological process	negative regulation of peptidase activity; hyaluronan metabolic process; negative regulation of endopeptidase activity; platelet degranulation
Sources:Amigo / QuickGO
Orthologs
Species	Human	Mouse
Entrez	3699	16426
Ensembl	ENSG00000162267	ENSMUSG00000006522
UniProt	Q06033	Q61704
RefSeq (mRNA)	NM_002217	NM_008407
RefSeq (protein)	NP_002208	NP_032433
Location (UCSC)	Chr 3: 52.79 – 52.81 Mb	Chr 14: 30.63 – 30.65 Mb
PubMed search
- Wikidata
View/Edit Human	View/Edit Mouse

Inter-alpha-trypsin inhibitor heavy chain H3 is a protein that in humans is encoded by the ITIH3 gene.

== See also ==
- Inter-alpha-trypsin inhibitor
- ITIH1
- ITIH2
- ITIH4
