= Gamma-glutamyl carboxylase =

Enzyme

GGCX

Identifiers
- Aliases: GGCX, VKCFD1, gamma-glutamyl carboxylase, Gamma-glutamyl carboxylase; GGCX
- External IDs: OMIM: 137167; MGI: 1927655; HomoloGene: 639; GeneCards: GGCX; OMA:GGCX - orthologs
Enzyme activity
EC #	BRENDA	ExPASy	KEGG	MetaCyc
4.1.1.90	↗	↗	↗	↗

Gene location (Human)
Chr.	Chromosome 2 (human)
Band	2p11.2	Start	85,544,720 bp
Band	2p11.2	End	85,561,532 bp
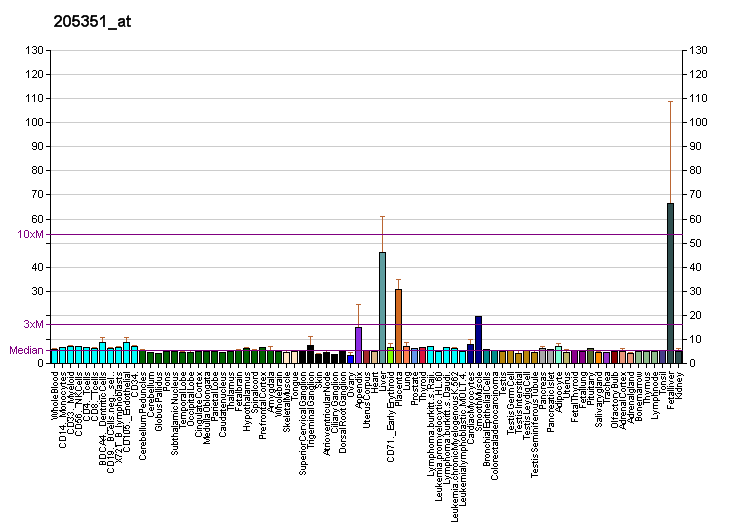

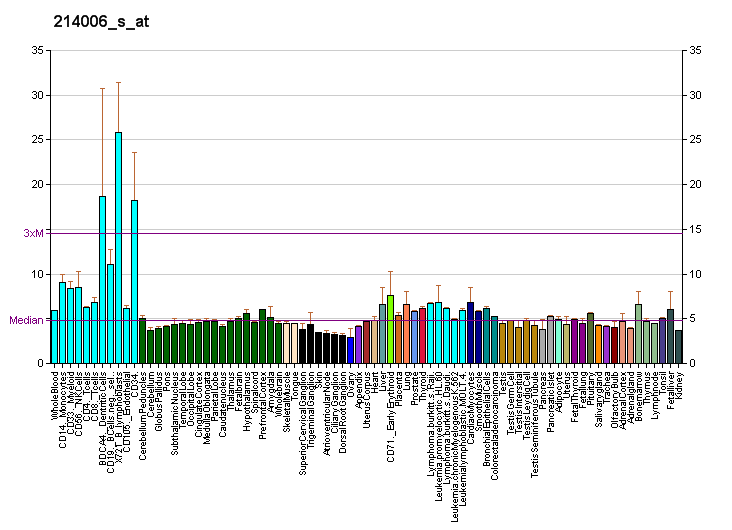
RNA expression pattern
Bgee	Human / Mouse (ortholog); Top expressed in: buccal mucosa cell; tendon of biceps brachii; liver; right lobe of liver; endothelial cell; stromal cell of endometrium; internal globus pallidus; saphenous vein; body of pancreas; parotid gland / n/a; More reference expression data
BioGPS	More reference expression data
Gene ontology
Molecular function	gamma-glutamyl carboxylase activity; lyase activity
Cellular component	integral component of membrane; endoplasmic reticulum membrane; membrane; endoplasmic reticulum
Biological process	peptidyl-glutamic acid carboxylation; blood coagulation
Sources:Amigo / QuickGO
Orthologs
Species	Human	Mouse
Entrez	2677	56316
Ensembl	ENSG00000115486	ENSMUSG00000053460
UniProt	P38435	Q9QYC7
RefSeq (mRNA)	NM_000821; NM_001142269; NM_001311312	NM_019802
RefSeq (protein)	NP_000812; NP_001135741; NP_001298241	NP_062776
Location (UCSC)	Chr 2: 85.54 – 85.56 Mb	n/a
PubMed search
- Wikidata
View/Edit Human	View/Edit Mouse

Gamma-glutamyl carboxylase is an enzyme that in humans is encoded by the GGCX gene, located on chromosome 2 at 2p12.

== Function ==
Gamma-glutamyl carboxylase is an enzyme that catalyzes the posttranslational modification of vitamin K-dependent proteins. Many of these vitamin K-dependent proteins are involved in coagulation so the function of the encoded enzyme is essential for hemostasis. Most gla domain-containing proteins depend on this carboxylation reaction for posttranslational modification. In humans, the gamma-glutamyl carboxylase enzyme is most highly expressed in the liver.

== Catalytic reaction ==
Gamma-glutamyl carboxylase oxidizes vitamin K hydroquinone to Vitamin K-2,3-epoxide, while simultaneously adding CO_{2} to protein-bound glutamic acid (abbreviation = Glu) to form gamma-carboxyglutamic acid (also called gamma-carboxyglutamate, abbreviation = Gla). Presence of two carboxylate groups causes chelation of Ca^{2+}, resulting in change in tertiary structure of protein and its activation. The carboxylation reaction will only proceed if the carboxylase enzyme is able to oxidize vitamin K hydroquinone to vitamin K epoxide at the same time; the carboxylation and epoxidation reactions are said to be coupled reactions.

a [protein]-α-L-glutamate (Glu) + phylloquinol (KH_{2}) + CO_{2} + oxygen → a [protein] 4-carboxy-L-glutamate (Gla) + vitamin K 2,3-epoxide (KO) + H^{+} + H_{2}O

No experimental structure is known for GGCX, limiting understanding of its reaction mechanism. Based on the fact that the two reactions are coupled, a computational study is able to propose how the reactants interact with each other to form the products. Lys228 has been shown to be the residue responsible for starting the reaction. How the enzyme holds the reactants in place to have them interact with each other remains poorly shown. 491-507 and 395-401 are probably responsible for propeptide and glutamate binding respectively.

== Clinical significance ==
Mutations in this gene are associated with vitamin K-dependent coagulation defect and PXE-like disorder with multiple coagulation factor deficiency.

== See also ==
- Carboxyglutamate
