= Albert Snell =

English footballer

- Albert Snell, Sunderland

Personal information
- Full name: Albert Snell
- Date of birth: 7 February 1931
- Date of death: 31 March 2007 (aged 76)
- Place of death: Doncaster, England
- Position: Left-half

Senior career*
| Years | Team | Apps | (Gls) |
| 1952–1955 | Sunderland | 9 | (1) |
| 1955–1957 | Halifax Town | 25 | (?) |
- * Club domestic league appearances and goals

Albert Snell (7 February 1931 – 31 March 2007) was an English professional footballer. Following the end of his football career, Snell entered teaching and later became known as a photographer.

== Playing career ==
Born near Doncaster to a family who had moved there from Sunderland, Albert Snell was spotted playing for Doncaster Rovers's junior side at the age of 18. He made his debut for Sunderland against Middlesbrough where manager Bill Murray had instructed him to mark Wilf Mannion in a game which finished with a 2–1 victory for Sunderland.

Having supported Sunderland AFC all his life, Snell made a total of nine senior team appearances for Sunderland, including a match against Chelsea in which he scored a 20-yard volley.

Snell's football career was cut short with a crippling knee injury from which he never fully recovered. Despite this he went on to make 25 league appearances for Halifax Town.

== Career after football and death ==
Following the end of his professional football career, Snell completed a teacher training course at Bede college, Durham and then read for an economics degree. He went on to teach at Bede Grammar School in Sunderland, played football for Silksworth, became deputy head at Monkwearmouth and then Headmaster of Heworth Comprehensive in Gateshead. In retirement, Snell was diagnosed with Parkinson's disease and died in Sunderland Royal Hospital on 31 March 2007 aged 76.

== Photographic career ==
Snell became a photographer and was honoured by the Royal Photographic Society. His work became known internationally, having won international exhibitions and awards. Snell was a former president of both Sunderland Photographic Society and the Northern Counties Photographic Federation.
