= Inter-alpha-trypsin inhibitor =

Inter-alpha-trypsin inhibitors (IαI) are plasma proteins consisting of two of four heavy chains selected from the group ITIH1, ITIH2, ITIH3, ITIH4 and one light chain selected from the group AMBP or SPINT2. They function as protease inhibitors.

IαI form complexes with hyaluronan (HA), generating a serum-derived hyaluronan-associated protein (SHAP)-HA complex. The SHAP-HA complex is found in very high concentration in rheumatoid arthritic synovial fluid suggesting it has a role in the inflammatory response.
