= GAS6 =

Human gene coding for the GAS6 protein

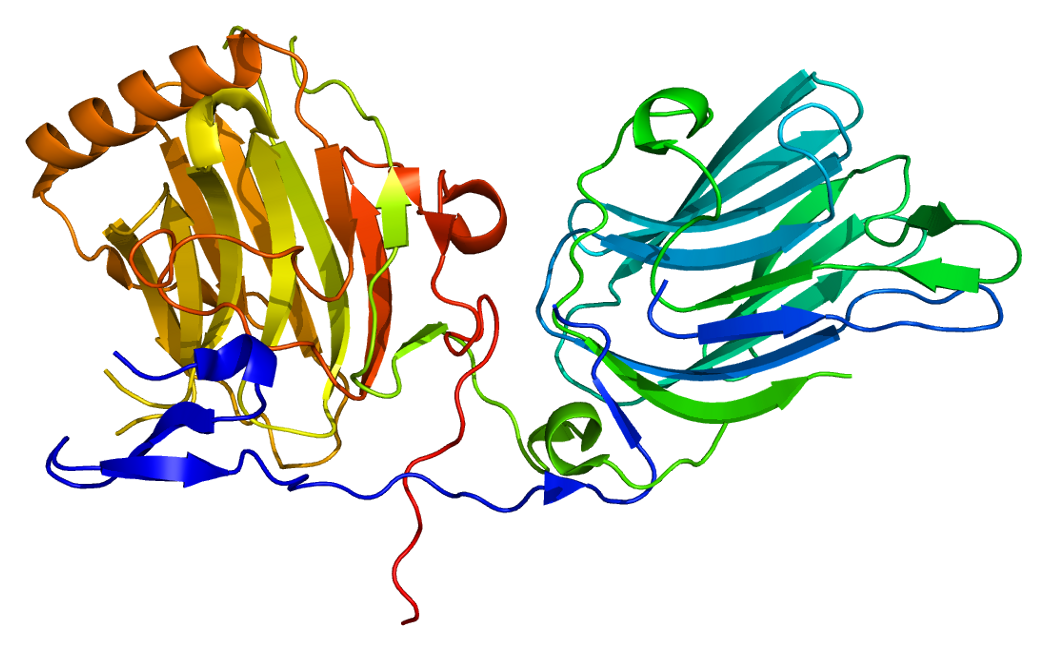

Identifiers
- Aliases: GAS6, AXLLG, AXSF, growth arrest specific 6
- External IDs: OMIM: 600441; MGI: 95660; GeneCards: GAS6
Available structures
PDB	Ortholog search: PDBe RCSB
PDB	List of PDB id codes 1H30, 2C5D, 4RA0

Gene location (Human)
Chr.	Chromosome 13 (human)
Band	13q34	Start	113,820,549 bp
Band	13q34	End	113,864,076 bp

Gene location (Mouse)
Chr.	Chromosome 8 (mouse)
Band	8 A1.1|8 6.06 cM	Start	13,515,374 bp
Band	8 A1.1|8 6.06 cM	End	13,544,490 bp
RNA expression pattern
Bgee	Human / Mouse (ortholog); Top expressed in: ascending aorta; Descending thoracic aorta; right uterine tube; right coronary artery; canal of the cervix; apex of heart; body of uterus; left uterine tube; popliteal artery; tibial arteries / Top expressed in: stroma of bone marrow; calvaria; choroid plexus of fourth ventricle; gallbladder; ankle; skin of external ear; right kidney; lip; epithelium of stomach; right lung; More reference expression data
BioGPS	n/a
Gene ontology
Molecular function	protein binding; signaling receptor binding; receptor tyrosine kinase binding; voltage-gated calcium channel activity; receptor ligand activity; molecular adaptor activity; phosphatidylserine binding; metal ion binding; protein tyrosine kinase activator activity; calcium ion binding; cysteine-type endopeptidase inhibitor activity involved in apoptotic process; protein-macromolecule adaptor activity
Cellular component	endoplasmic reticulum lumen; cytoplasm; Golgi lumen; platelet alpha granule lumen; extracellular exosome; extracellular region; intracellular anatomical structure; extracellular space
Biological process	positive regulation of natural killer cell differentiation; apoptotic cell clearance; cellular response to vitamin K; negative regulation of DNA-binding transcription factor activity; positive regulation of protein kinase activity; negative regulation of biomineral tissue development; negative regulation of tumor necrosis factor-mediated signaling pathway; cellular response to starvation; positive regulation of phagocytosis; positive regulation of protein kinase B signaling; positive regulation of cytokine-mediated signaling pathway; positive regulation of gene expression; dendritic cell differentiation; neuron migration; cell adhesion; protein kinase B signaling; positive regulation of glomerular filtration; B cell chemotaxis; negative regulation of apoptotic process; positive regulation of ERK1 and ERK2 cascade; phagocytosis; regulation of growth; activation of protein kinase B activity; negative regulation of tumor necrosis factor production; platelet degranulation; viral entry into host cell; negative regulation of oligodendrocyte apoptotic process; leukocyte migration; enzyme linked receptor protein signaling pathway; positive regulation of protein tyrosine kinase activity; cell migration; platelet activation; negative regulation of transcription, DNA-templated; positive regulation of protein export from nucleus; animal organ regeneration; cellular response to growth factor stimulus; negative regulation of interferon-gamma production; macrophage cytokine production; cellular response to glucose stimulus; hematopoietic stem cell migration to bone marrow; negative regulation of dendritic cell apoptotic process; calcium ion transmembrane transport; cell-substrate adhesion; negative regulation of interleukin-6 production; positive regulation of dendritic cell chemotaxis; signal peptide processing; viral genome replication; cell population proliferation; positive regulation of fibroblast proliferation; negative regulation of cysteine-type endopeptidase activity involved in apoptotic process; negative regulation of fibroblast apoptotic process; positive regulation of peptidyl-serine phosphorylation; platelet aggregation; positive regulation of TOR signaling; peptidyl-serine phosphorylation; endoplasmic reticulum to Golgi vesicle-mediated transport; viral process; extracellular matrix assembly; cellular response to interferon-alpha; protein phosphorylation; negative regulation of renal albumin absorption; negative regulation of endothelial cell apoptotic process; positive regulation of protein phosphorylation; signal transduction; blood coagulation; apoptotic process; post-translational protein modification; protein localization to plasma membrane; regulation of signaling receptor activity
Sources:Amigo / QuickGO
Orthologs
Databases	NCBI: entry; OMA: entry
Species	Human	Mouse
Entrez	2621	14456
Ensembl	ENSG00000183087	ENSMUSG00000031451
UniProt	Q14393	Q61592
RefSeq (mRNA)	NM_001143946; NM_000820; NM_001143945	NM_019521
RefSeq (protein)	NP_000811	NP_062394
Location (UCSC)	Chr 13: 113.82 – 113.86 Mb	Chr 8: 13.52 – 13.54 Mb
PubMed search
- Wikidata
View/Edit Human	View/Edit Mouse

Growth arrest – specific 6, also known as GAS6, is both a human gene and the protein it codes for. It is similar to the Protein S with the same domain organization and 43% amino acid identity. It was originally found as a gene upregulated by growth arrested fibroblasts.

== Function ==
Gas6 is a gamma-carboxyglutamic acid (Gla) domain-containing protein thought to be involved in the stimulation of cell proliferation.

== Interactions ==
Gas6 has been shown to interact with AXL receptor tyrosine kinase, MerTK and TYRO3.

The presence of Gla needs a vitamin K-dependent enzymatic reaction that carboxylates the gamma carbon of certain glutamic residues of the protein during its production in the endoplasmic reticulum. The action of vitamin K is essential on GAS6 function.
