= Periostin =

Protein-coding gene in the species Homo sapiens

POSTN

Identifiers
- Aliases: POSTN, OSF-2, OSF2, PDLPN, periostin
- External IDs: OMIM: 608777; MGI: 1926321; GeneCards: POSTN

Gene location (Human)
Chr.	Chromosome 13 (human)
Band	13q13.3	Start	37,562,583 bp
Band	13q13.3	End	37,598,844 bp

Gene location (Mouse)
Chr.	Chromosome 3 (mouse)
Band	3|3 C	Start	54,268,530 bp
Band	3|3 C	End	54,298,458 bp
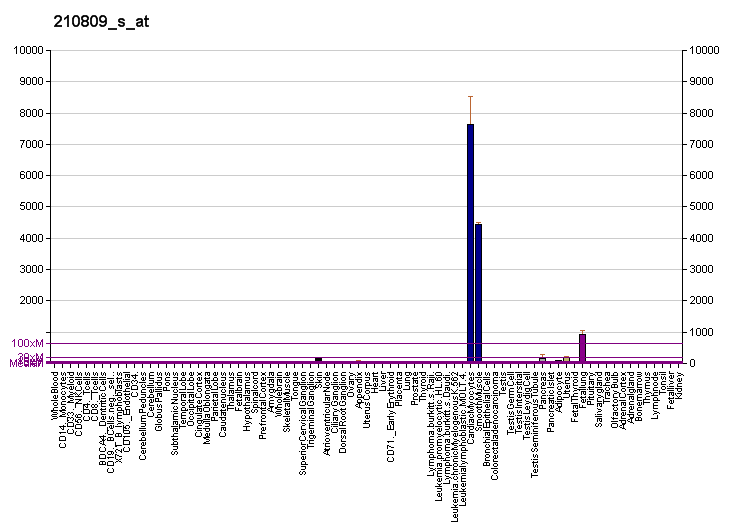
RNA expression pattern
Bgee	Human / Mouse (ortholog); Top expressed in: periodontal fiber; visceral pleura; skin of hip; cartilage tissue; mucosa of paranasal sinus; skin of thigh; pylorus; skin of arm; Descending thoracic aorta; lactiferous duct / Top expressed in: atrioventricular valve; body of femur; dermis; efferent ductule; umbilical cord; tunica media of zone of aorta; skin of external ear; external carotid artery; human fetus; internal carotid artery; More reference expression data
BioGPS	More reference expression data
Gene ontology
Molecular function	metal ion binding; heparin binding; protein binding; extracellular matrix structural constituent; cell adhesion molecule binding
Cellular component	extracellular region; cytoplasm; trans-Golgi network; Golgi apparatus; extracellular matrix; neuromuscular junction; extracellular space; collagen-containing extracellular matrix
Biological process	negative regulation of substrate adhesion-dependent cell spreading; regulation of Notch signaling pathway; response to hypoxia; response to mechanical stimulus; neuron projection extension; wound healing; regulation of systemic arterial blood pressure; skeletal system development; response to estradiol; cellular response to fibroblast growth factor stimulus; bone regeneration; tissue development; positive regulation of smooth muscle cell migration; cellular response to transforming growth factor beta stimulus; negative regulation of cell-matrix adhesion; response to muscle activity; cell adhesion; cellular response to tumor necrosis factor; cellular response to vitamin K; extracellular matrix organization
Sources:Amigo / QuickGO
Orthologs
Databases	NCBI: entry; OMA: entry
Species	Human	Mouse
Entrez	10631	50706
Ensembl	ENSG00000133110	ENSMUSG00000027750
UniProt	Q15063	Q62009
RefSeq (mRNA)	NM_001135934; NM_001135935; NM_001135936; NM_001286665; NM_001286666 NM_001286667; NM_006475; NM_001330517	NM_001198765; NM_001198766; NM_015784; NM_001313898; NM_001313899 NM_001368678
RefSeq (protein)	NP_001129406; NP_001129407; NP_001129408; NP_001273594; NP_001273595 NP_001273596; NP_001317446; NP_006466; NP_006466.2	NP_001185694; NP_001185695; NP_001300827; NP_001300828; NP_056599 NP_001355607
Location (UCSC)	Chr 13: 37.56 – 37.6 Mb	Chr 3: 54.27 – 54.3 Mb
PubMed search
- Wikidata
View/Edit Human	View/Edit Mouse

Periostin (POSTN, PN, or osteoblast-specific factor OSF-2) is a protein that in humans is encoded by the POSTN gene. Periostin functions as a ligand for alpha-V/beta-3 and alpha-V/beta-5 integrins to support adhesion and migration of epithelial cells.

Periostin is a gla domain vitamin K dependent factor.

== Function ==
Periostin is a secreted extracellular matrix protein that was originally identified in cells from the mesenchymal lineage (osteoblasts, osteoblast-derived cells, the periodontal ligament, and periosteum). It has been associated with the epithelial-mesenchymal transition in cancer and with the differentiation of mesenchyme in the developing heart. This protein shares a homology with fasciclin I, a secreted cell adhesion molecule found in insects.

In many cancers, periostin binds to integrins on cancer cells, activating the Akt/PKB- and FAK-mediated signaling pathways. This leads to increased cell survival, invasion, angiogenesis, metastasis, and the epithelial-mesenchymal transition.

In humans and mice, periostin undergoes alternative splicing in its C-terminal region, resulting in specific isoforms that can be observed in a broad range of cancers such as pancreatic, colon, and breast cancer.

While periostin plays a wide variety of roles in tissue development along with disease, its function in tissue remodeling as a response to injury is a common underlying role in these different mechanisms. Periostin is transiently upregulated during cell fate changes, whether they are related to alterations in physiology or to pathological changes. It influences extracellular matrix restructuring, tissue remodeling, and the epithelial-mesenchymal transition, all of which can be related to tissue healing, development, and disease. Thus, it functions as a mediator, balancing appropriate and inappropriate responses to tissue damage.

== Clinical significance ==
=== In valvular heart disease ===
Periostin plays a critical role in the development of cardiac valves and in degenerative valvular heart disease. While periostin usually is localized to the subendothelial layer in healthy heart valves, its levels are highly increased in infiltrated inflammatory cells and myofibroblasts in angiogenic areas in atherosclerotic and rheumatic valvular heart disease in humans. Periostin has also been shown to increase the secretion of matrix metalloproteinase from valvular interstitial cells, endothelial cells, and macrophages. It is thought that periostin plays a role in cardiac valve complex degeneration by inducing both angiogenesis and matrix metalloproteinase production.

=== In tissue regeneration and healing ===
As a matricellular protein, periostin is also important for tissue regeneration. In healthy human skin, periostin is expressed at basal levels and is expressed in the epidermis and hair follicles along with fibronectin and laminin γ2. Periostin is involved in wound healing - when periostin is absent, wound healing is impeded. This delay in wound closure is also associated with a delay in re-epithelialization and a reduction in the proliferation of keratinocytes. Periostin localizes to the extracellular compartment of cells during tissue remodeling associated with wound repair. It may also promote injury closure by facilitating the activation, differentiation, and contraction of fibroblasts. However, the increase in periostin expression associated with tissue regeneration post-injury is transient, starting a few days post-injury, peaking after seven days post-injury, and decreasing afterwards.

=== In asthma ===
Periostin is associated with asthma, a fact that is exploited by the experimental asthma medication lebrikizumab.

=== In cancer ===
Periostin over-expression was reported in several types of cancer, most frequently in the environment of tumor cells. Recent evidence shows that periostin is a component of the extracellular matrix expressed by fibroblasts in normal tissues and stroma of primary tumor. The metastatic colony formation requires the induction of periostin in the foreign stroma by the infiltrating cancer cells. Periostin production is upregulated in lung fibroblasts by either TGF-β2 or TGF-β3, the latter being secreted by infiltrating cancer stem cells (in MMTV-PyMT mouse breast cancer model)

Periostin has been shown to be highly upregulated in glioblastomas (grade IV gliomas) compared to the normal brain. In gliomas, periostin expression levels correlate directly with tumor grade and recurrence, and inversely with survival. It has been shown that glioma stem cells in glioblastomas secrete periostin, which recruits M2 tumor-associated macrophages from peripheral blood to the tumor environment via αvβ3 integrin signaling. These M2 TAMs differentiate from monocytes once they enter the tumor tissue. Through this recruitment mechanism, periostin supports tumor progression, as M2 tumor-associated macrophages are tumor-supportive and immunosuppressive. In this environment, periostin functions as a chemoattractant, promoting both migration and invasion of macrophages and monocytes into glioblastomas in a dose-dependent manner. Clinically, periostin-associated gene signatures, which are predominated by secreted and matrix proteins, correspond to patient prognosis and malignancy. Given its features related to glioblastoma progression, periostin is a marker of glioma malignancy as well as recurrence of tumors, making it a possible target for therapy that continues to be studied and explored.

Table: Periostin expression in various cancer cell lines.

Cell line	Origin	POSTN/ACTB^{1}
U2OS	Osteosarcoma	3.5±1.7
LB96	Ewing sarcoma	0
LB23-1	Rhabdomyosarcoma	0.1±0.1
HeLa	Cervical cancer	3.0±0.4
PA-1	Ovarian teratocarcinoma	1.4±0.1
LB37-1	NSCLC	
LB85	SCLC	3.4±0.2
LB92	SCLC	0.6±0.2
LB1047	Renal cell carcinoma	0.8±0.2
BB64	Renal cell carcinoma	0.08±0.01
LB108	Colorectal cancer	0
MCF7	Breast Cancer	0
Hs578T	Breast Cancer	3693±86
Panc-1	Pancreatic carcinoma	0
Capan-1	Pancreatic carcinoma	0
Huh-7	Hepatocarcinoma	0.3±0.07
LB831	Bladder carcinoma	1748±74
MZGC3	Stomach cancer	0
A172	Glioblastoma	45±4
MZ2	Melanoma	2.3±0.7
LB39	Melanoma	0.5±0.03
LB2586-7	Melanoma	3.4±0.3
LB2201-3	Melanoma	4.2±0.4
A375	Melanoma	4.7±1.2

^{1} (cDNA POSTN/cDNA ACTB) × 10^{4}
