= Protein Z =

Mammalian protein involved in blood clotting

PROZ
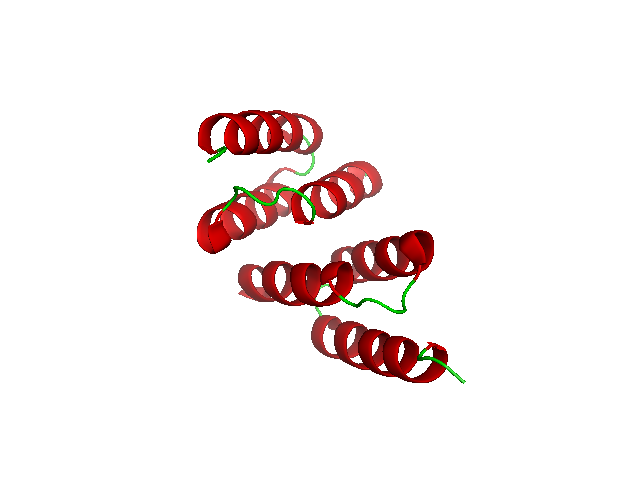

Identifiers
- Aliases: PROZ, PZ, Protein Z, protein Z, vitamin K dependent plasma glycoprotein
- External IDs: OMIM: 176895; MGI: 1860488; GeneCards: PROZ
Available structures
PDB	Ortholog search: PDBe RCSB
PDB	List of PDB id codes 3F1S

Gene location (Human)
Chr.	Chromosome 13 (human)
Band	13q34	Start	113,158,648 bp
Band	13q34	End	113,172,386 bp

Gene location (Mouse)
Chr.	Chromosome 8 (mouse)
Band	8|8 A1.1	Start	13,110,914 bp
Band	8|8 A1.1	End	13,126,026 bp
RNA expression pattern
Bgee	Human / Mouse (ortholog); Top expressed in: right lobe of liver; kidney tubule; glomerulus; metanephric glomerulus; human kidney; mucosa of transverse colon; right testis; cerebellar hemisphere; right hemisphere of cerebellum; pituitary gland / Top expressed in: liver; left lobe of liver; yolk sac; granulocyte; epithelium of small intestine; right kidney; duodenum; dentate gyrus of hippocampal formation granule cell; superior frontal gyrus; primary visual cortex; More reference expression data
BioGPS	n/a
Gene ontology
Molecular function	calcium ion binding; serine-type endopeptidase activity
Cellular component	Golgi lumen; extracellular region; endoplasmic reticulum lumen; extracellular exosome; extracellular space
Biological process	hemostasis; endoplasmic reticulum to Golgi vesicle-mediated transport; peptidyl-glutamic acid carboxylation; signal peptide processing; proteolysis; blood coagulation; negative regulation of blood coagulation
Sources:Amigo / QuickGO
Orthologs
Databases	NCBI: entry; OMA: entry
Species	Human	Mouse
Entrez	8858	66901
Ensembl	ENSG00000126231	ENSMUSG00000031445
UniProt	P22891	Q9CQW3
RefSeq (mRNA)	NM_001256134; NM_003891	NM_025834; NM_001357219; NM_001357220
RefSeq (protein)	NP_001243063; NP_003882	NP_080110; NP_001344148; NP_001344149
Location (UCSC)	Chr 13: 113.16 – 113.17 Mb	Chr 8: 13.11 – 13.13 Mb
PubMed search
- Wikidata
View/Edit Human	View/Edit Mouse

Protein Z (PZ or PROZ), vitamin K-dependent protein Z, is a protein encoded in the human by the PROZ gene.

Protein Z is a member of the coagulation cascade, the group of blood proteins that leads to the formation of blood clots. It is a glycoprotein. Protein Z functions to inhibit blood coagulation by binding to an inhibitor. It is a GLA domain protein and thus Vitamin K-dependent, and its functionality is therefore impaired in warfarin therapy.

== Physiology ==
Although it is not enzymatically active, it is structurally related to several serine proteases of the coagulation cascade: Factors VII, IX, X and Protein C. The carboxyglutamate residues (which require Vitamin K) bind Protein Z to phospholipid surfaces.

The main role of Protein Z appears to be the degradation of Factor Xa. This is done by Protein Z-related protease inhibitor (ZPI), but the reaction is accelerated 1000-fold by the presence of Protein Z. Oddly, ZPI also degrades Factor XI, but this reaction does not require the presence of Protein Z. ZPI activated by Protein Z does not appear to happen because of its conformation, but proximity to each other. When Protein Z in bound to ZPI, it will bind to the same phospholipid surface as Factor Xa. This is what promotes the inhibition of Factor Xa.

In some studies, deficiency states have been associated with a propensity to thrombosis. Others, however, link it to bleeding tendency; there is no clear explanation for this, as it acts physiologically as an inhibitor, and deficiency would logically have led to a predisposition for thrombosis.

== Genetics ==
It is 62 kDa large and 396 amino acids long. The PROZ gene is located on chromosome 13 (13q34).

It has four domains: a GLA-rich region, two EGF-like domains and a trypsin-like domain. It lacks the serine residue that would make it catalytically active as a serine protease.

== History ==
Protein Z was first isolated in cattle blood by Christopher Prowse and Peter Esnouf in 1977, and Broze & Miletich determined it in human plasma in 1984. Protein Z found in humans was given the same name as the one found in cattle for a few reasons. When looking at these isolated proteins it was found that they both have similar molecular weight, a similar composition of amino acids, and a similar Amino Terminal sequences. These similarities in molecular composition of the protein found in cattle and humans was great enough that it can be concluded they were the same protein. When Protein Z was first discovered, it was theorized to be a form of Factor X instead of its own individual protein. Research had to be done to isolate this protein to find out if it was a form of Factor X or not. To test this, Vitamin K dependents were removed from the sample by adsorption to barium citrate, then an ion exchange chromatography was performed. This process showed that there was no Factor X in the isolated protein. The purified Protein Z in this experiment was distinct from Factor X, proving it was a separate protein.

== Structure ==
Structural analysis of Protein Z will allow better understanding of its function. The Ramachandran plot for Protein Z indicates it will form alpha helices. The final structure, all alpha domain, was determined by x-ray diffraction. It consists of chain A and B, which are both helix-loop-helix motifs.PDB: 1LP1 The secondary structures of this protein are color coded in the image in the top left; pink represents the strands, yellow represents alpha helices and white is the coils.

== Health ==
There are many reasons that Protein Z is important in health. In pregnancy it is vital that the protein is functioning correctly. It has been found that if it isn't functioning correctly, it can lead to fetal death or hypersensitive disorders in pregnancy. This happens because when the levels of this protein drop too low, it can lead to fetal growth restrictions. Another possible effect is having a high sensitivity to this protein which could correlate with diabetes. In women diagnosed with ovarian cancers, it was found the protein was inhibiting Factor Xa which happens because there is a lower regulation of this protein in cancer cells.
