= Osteocalcin =

Mammalian protein found in humans

BGLAP
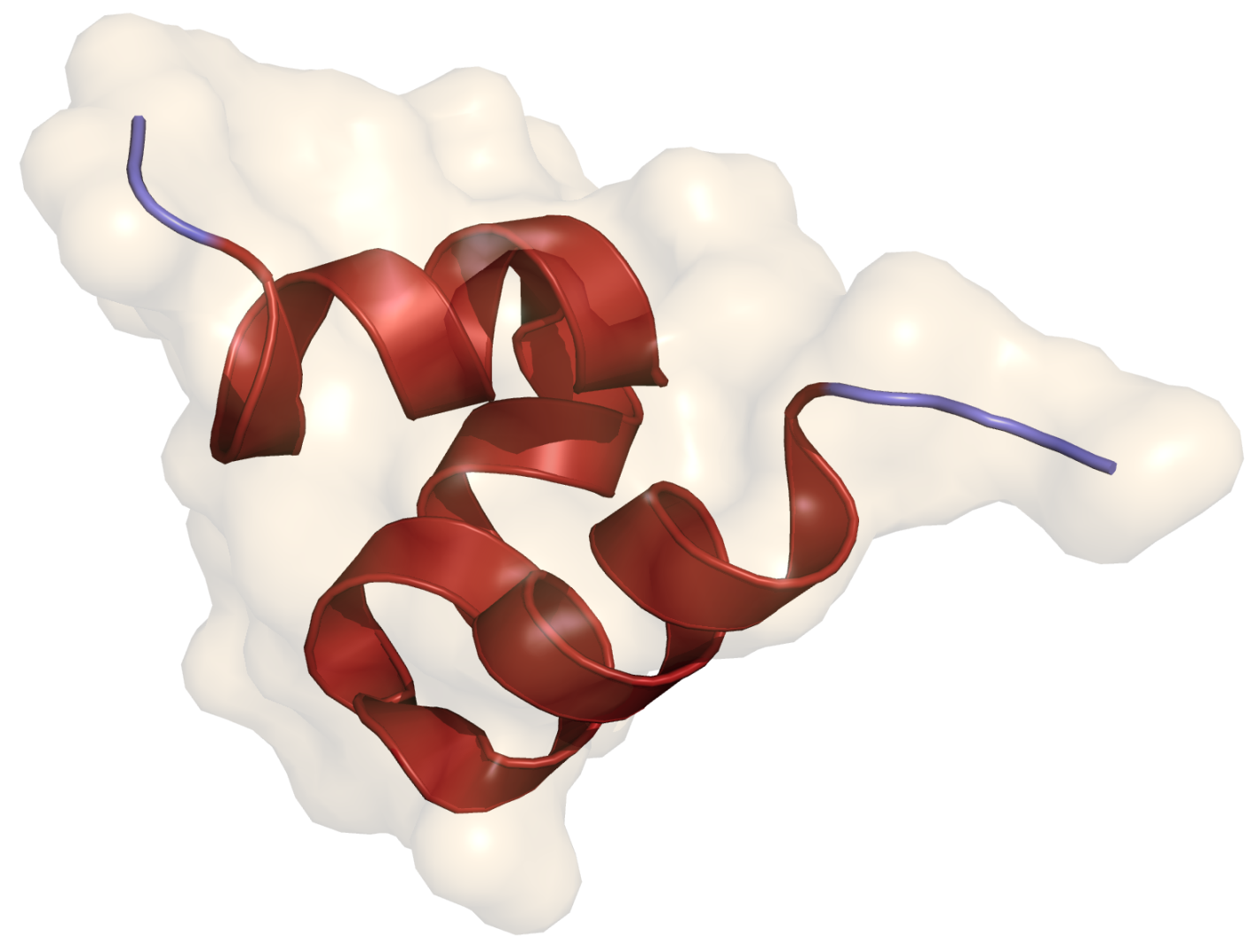

Identifiers
- Aliases: BGLAP, BGP, OC, OCN, bone gamma-carboxyglutamate protein, Osteocalcin
- External IDs: OMIM: 112260; MGI: 88155; GeneCards: BGLAP

Gene location (Human)
Chr.	Chromosome 1 (human)
Band	1q22	Start	156,242,184 bp
Band	1q22	End	156,243,317 bp

Gene location (Mouse)
Chr.	Chromosome 3 (mouse)
Band	3 F1|3 38.81 cM	Start	88,275,923 bp
Band	3 F1|3 38.81 cM	End	88,280,050 bp
RNA expression pattern
Bgee	Human / Mouse (ortholog); Top expressed in: testicle; gonad; right hemisphere of cerebellum; C1 segment; muscle layer of sigmoid colon; putamen; substantia nigra; caudate nucleus; nucleus accumbens; right uterine tube / Top expressed in: esophagus; cochlea; lip; placenta; lymph node; stomach; white adipose tissue; thyroid gland; morula; bone marrow; More reference expression data
BioGPS	n/a
Gene ontology
Molecular function	calcium ion binding; structural molecule activity; metal ion binding; hydroxyapatite binding; structural constituent of bone
Cellular component	cytoplasm; perikaryon; rough endoplasmic reticulum; Golgi apparatus; cell projection; endoplasmic reticulum lumen; extracellular region; dendrite; Golgi lumen; extracellular space; vesicle
Biological process	skeletal system development; bone mineralization; response to vitamin D; response to organic cyclic compound; ossification; response to testosterone; regulation of bone mineralization; biomineral tissue development; cellular response to growth factor stimulus; response to mechanical stimulus; ageing; response to zinc ion; response to glucocorticoid; cellular response to vitamin D; response to activity; response to estrogen; odontogenesis; endoplasmic reticulum to Golgi vesicle-mediated transport; response to gravity; response to vitamin K; response to hydroxyisoflavone; cell adhesion; response to nutrient levels; regulation of osteoclast differentiation; osteoblast differentiation; response to inorganic substance; osteoblast development; response to ethanol; regulation of bone resorption; bone development; regulation of cellular response to insulin stimulus
Sources:Amigo / QuickGO
Orthologs
Databases	NCBI: entry; OMA: entry
Species	Human	Mouse
Entrez	632	12095
Ensembl	ENSG00000242252	ENSMUSG00000074489
UniProt	P02818	P54615
RefSeq (mRNA)	NM_199173	NM_031368; NM_001305448; NM_001305449; NM_001305450
RefSeq (protein)	NP_954642	NP_001292377; NP_001292378; NP_001292379; NP_112736
Location (UCSC)	Chr 1: 156.24 – 156.24 Mb	Chr 3: 88.28 – 88.28 Mb
PubMed search
- Wikidata
View/Edit Human	View/Edit Mouse

Osteocalcin, also known as bone gamma-carboxyglutamic acid-containing protein (BGLAP), is a small (49-amino-acid) noncollagenous protein hormone found in bone and dentin, first identified as a calcium-binding protein.

Because osteocalcin has gla domains, its synthesis is vitamin K_{2}–dependent. In humans, osteocalcin is encoded by the BGLAP gene. Its receptors include GPRC6A, GPR158, and possibly a third, yet-to-be-identified receptor. There is evidence that GPR37 might be the third osteocalcin receptor.

== Function ==
Osteocalcin is secreted solely by osteoblasts and is thought to play a role in the body's metabolic regulation. In its carboxylated form, osteocalcin binds directly to calcium in bone and thus concentrates there.

In its uncarboxylated form, osteocalcin acts as a hormone in the body, signalling in the pancreas, fat, muscle, testes, and brain.

- In the pancreas, osteocalcin acts on beta cells, causing beta cells in the pancreas to release more insulin.
- In fat cells, osteocalcin triggers the release of the adiponectin hormone, which increases insulin sensitivity.
- In muscle, osteocalcin acts on myocytes to promote energy availability and utilization and, in this manner, favors exercise capacity.
- In the testes, osteocalcin acts on Leydig cells, stimulating testosterone biosynthesis and affecting male fertility.
- In the brain, osteocalcin plays an important role in development and functioning, including spatial learning and memory.

An acute stress response (ASR), colloquially known as the fight-or-flight response, stimulates osteocalcin release from bone within minutes in mice, rats, and humans. Injections of high levels of osteocalcin alone can trigger an ASR in the presence of adrenal insufficiency.

== Use as a biochemical marker for bone formation ==
As osteoblasts produce osteocalcin, it is often used as a marker for the bone formation process. Higher serum osteocalcin levels have been observed to correlate relatively well with increases in bone mineral density during treatment with anabolic bone formation drugs for osteoporosis, such as teriparatide. In many studies, osteocalcin is used as a preliminary biomarker for the effectiveness of a given drug on bone formation. For instance, one study of the efficacy of a glycoprotein called lactoferrin on bone formation used osteocalcin to measure osteoblast activity.
