= Carboxylation =

Chemical conversion reaction

Carboxylation is a chemical reaction in which a carboxylic acid is produced by treating a substrate with carbon dioxide. The opposite reaction is decarboxylation. In chemistry, the term carbonation is sometimes used synonymously with carboxylation, especially when applied to the reaction of carbanionic reagents with CO_{2}. More generally, carbonation usually describes the production of carbonates.

== Organic chemistry ==
Carboxylation is a standard conversion in organic chemistry. Specifically carbonation (i.e., carboxylation) of Grignard reagents, organolithium, and related carbanionic reagents is a classic way to convert organic halides into carboxylic acids. This approach give carboxylate salts. Typically, these salts are converted to the carboxylic acid.

Sodium salicylate, precursor to aspirin, is commercially produced by treating sodium phenolate (the sodium salt of phenol) with carbon dioxide at high pressure (100 atm) and high temperature (390 K). Acidification of the resulting salicylate salt gives salicylic acid.

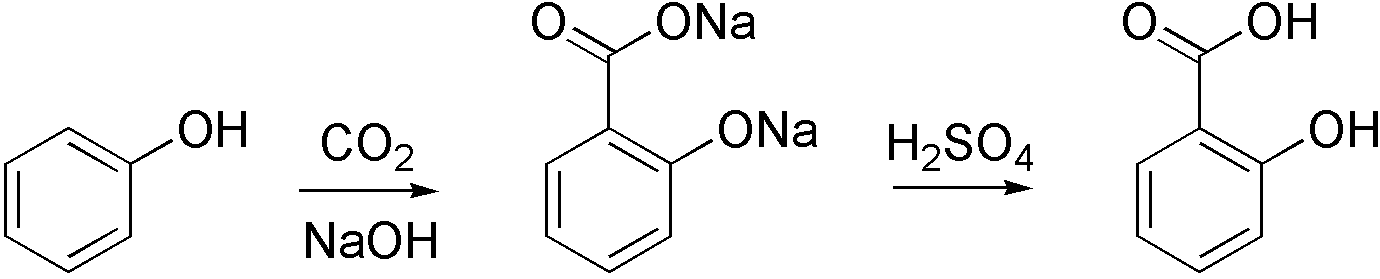

The method, known as the Kolbe-Schmitt reaction, entails nucleophilic attack of the phenoxide on carbon dioxide.

In some cases, alkenes undergo hydrocarboxylation using a mixture of carbon dioxide and H_{2}:

RCH=CH_{2} + H_{2} + CO_{2} → RCH_{2}−CH_{2}CO_{2}H

Other methods, e.g. the Koch reaction, effect "net" carboxylation involve the use of carbon monoxide, either directly or generated in situ. These methods are variants of carbonylation reactions.

Carboxylation of epoxides gives cyclic carbonates. Such reactions are catalyzed by N-Heterocyclic carbenes and catalysts based on silver.

== Carboxylation in biochemistry ==
Food chains usually originate from carboxylation that couples carbon dioxide to a sugar. The process is usually catalysed by the enzyme RuBisCO. Ribulose-1,5-bisphosphate carboxylase/oxygenase, the enzyme that catalyzes this carboxylation, is possibly the single most abundant protein on Earth.

The Calvin cycle showing the carboxylation of ribulose-1,5-bisphosphate.

Carboxyglutamic acid

Many carboxylases, including acetyl-CoA carboxylase, methylcrotonyl-CoA carboxylase, propionyl-CoA carboxylase, and pyruvate carboxylase require biotin as a cofactor. These enzymes are involved in various anabolic pathways. In the EC scheme, such carboxylases are mostly classed under EC 6.4.1, ligases “forming carbon-carbon bonds,” or sometimes EC 6.3.4, "Other Carbon—Nitrogen Ligases".

Another example is the posttranslational modification of glutamate residues, to γ-carboxyglutamate, in proteins. It occurs primarily in proteins involved in the blood clotting cascade, specifically factors II, VII, IX, and X, protein C, and protein S, and also in some bone proteins. This modification is required for these proteins to function. Carboxylation occurs in the liver and is performed by γ-glutamyl carboxylase (GGCX). GGCX requires vitamin K as a cofactor and performs the reaction in a processive manner. γ-carboxyglutamate binds calcium, which is essential for its activity. For example, in prothrombin, calcium binding allows the protein to associate with the plasma membrane in platelets, bringing it into close proximity with the proteins that cleave prothrombin to active thrombin after injury.

== See also ==
- Decarboxylation
- Carboxy-lyases
