= Protein S deficiency =

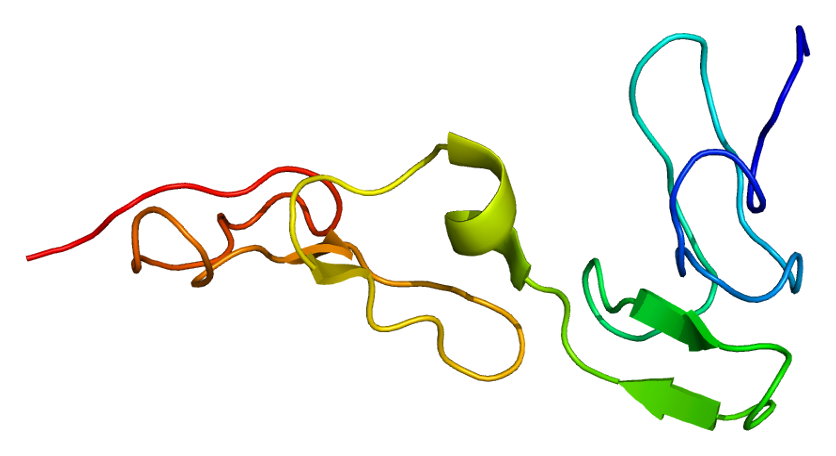
- Protein S structure
- Specialty: Hematology
- Symptoms: Purpura fulminans
- Causes: Vitamin K deficiency
- Diagnostic method: Coagulation test
- Treatment: Heparin, Warfarin

Protein S deficiency is a disorder associated with increased risk of venous thrombosis. Protein S, a vitamin K-dependent physiological anticoagulant, acts as a nonenzymatic cofactor to activate protein C in the degradation of factor Va and factor VIIIa.

Decreased (antigen) levels or impaired function of protein S leads to decreased degradation of factor Va and factor VIIIa and an increased propensity to venous thrombosis. Some risk factors for deep vein thrombosis or pulmonary embolism in patients with protein S deficiency include pregnancy, older age, hormonal therapy, consumption of birth control pills, recent surgery, trauma, and physical inactivity. Protein S circulates in human plasma in two forms: approximately 60 percent is bound to complement component C4b β-chain while the remaining 40 percent is free, only free protein S has activated protein C cofactor activity

== Signs and symptoms ==
Among the possible presentation of protein S deficiency are:

- Thrombosis of lower extremities
- Superficial thrombophlebitis
- Redness in affected area
- Purpura fulminans
- Pulmonary embolism
- Stroke (in children)

== Cause ==
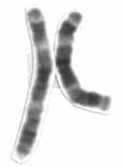
Human Chr 3

In terms of the cause of protein S deficiency it can be in inherited via autosomal dominance. A mutation in the PROS1 gene triggers the condition. The cytogenetic location of the gene in question is chromosome 3, specifically 3q11.1 Protein S deficiency can also be acquired due to vitamin K deficiency, treatment with warfarin, liver disease, kidney disease, chemotherapy, infection, surgery, birth control pills, pregnancy, and acute thrombosis (antiphospholipid antibodies may also be a cause as well)

== Pathophysiology ==
In regards to the mechanism of protein S deficiency, Protein S is made in liver cells and the Endothelium. Protein S is a cofactor of APC both work to degrade factor V and factor VIII. It has been suggested that Zn2+ might be necessary for Protein S binding to factor Xa.

Mutations in this condition change amino acids, which in turn disrupts blood clotting. Functional protein S is lacking, which normally turns off clotting proteins, this increases risk of blood clots.

== Diagnosis ==
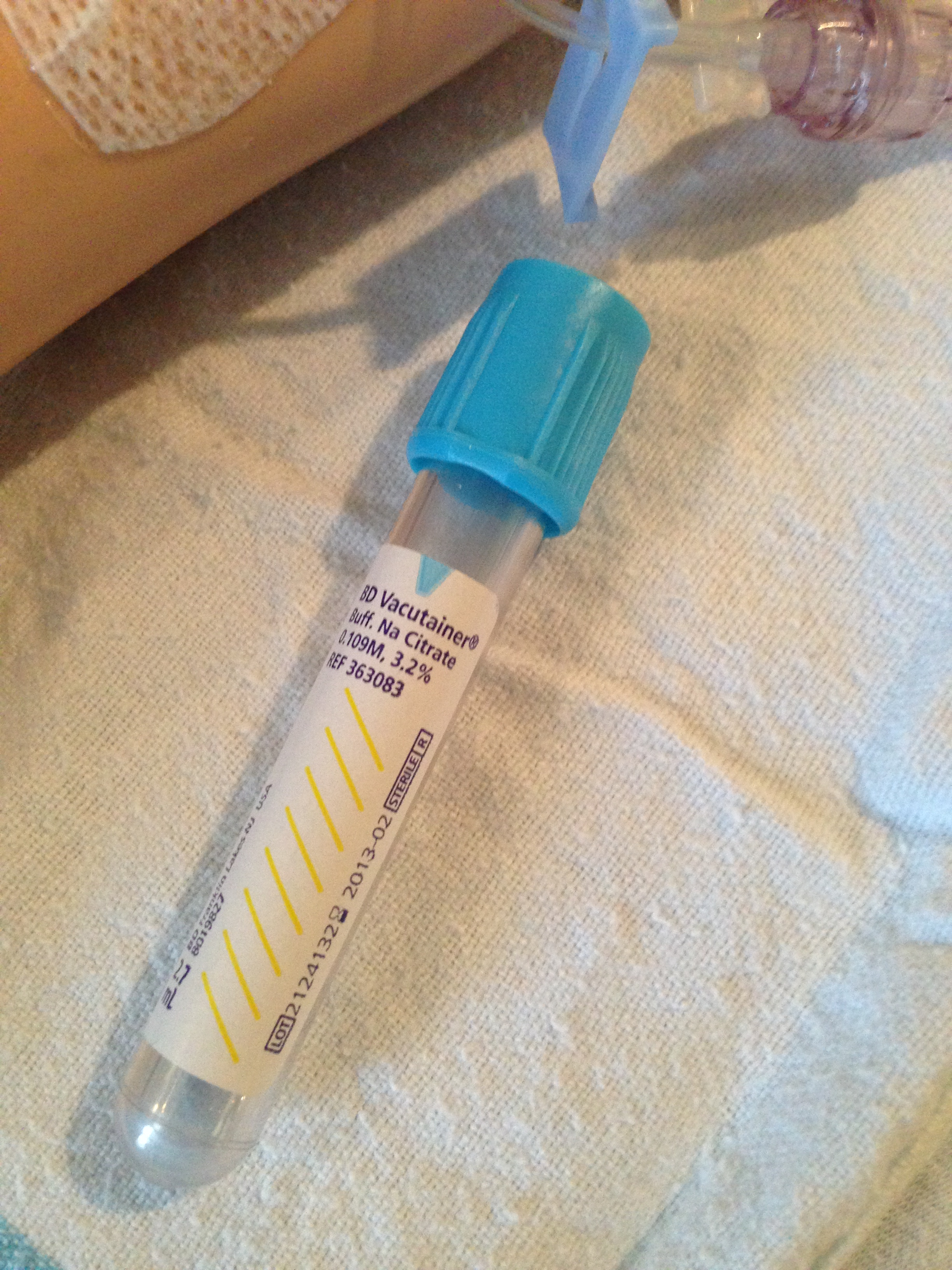
PTT blood tests Vacutainer tube

The diagnosis for deficiency of protein S can be done as part of a thrombophilia investigation, along with reviewing family history of thrombotic disease. Testing for protein S deficiency should be delayed if there are causes for acquired deficiency or interfering factors.

The initial assay for congenital protein S deficiency should be the free protein S antigen assay. If the level is low, total protein S antigen assay can be performed to differentiate between type I and type III deficiency. Protein S activity assays may be useful in patients with a normal free protein S antigen in occasional situations: 1) if no abnormality is identified during a thrombophilia workup, but clinical suspicion persists; or 2) in specific populations in which type II deficiencies are more common.

Screening with a free protein S antigen assay is preferred because there are fewer interferences compared to assays for protein S activity, as well as better assay performance characteristics.

=== Differential diagnosis ===
Other causes for thrombophilia are- Antiphospholipid syndrome, Factor V Leiden and Prothrombin G20210A mutations, protein C deficiency and antithrombin deficiency (though this list is not exhaustive)

=== Types ===
There are three types of hereditary protein S deficiency:

- Type I – decreased protein S activity: decreased total protein S levels, as well as decreased free protein S levels
- Type II – decreased in regards to the cofactor activity of the protein
- Type III – decreased protein S activity: decreased free protein S levels (normal total protein S levels)

== Treatment ==
Dabigatran etexilate

In terms of treatment for protein S deficiency the following are consistent with the management (and administration of) individuals with this condition (the prognosis for inherited homozygotes is usually in line with a higher incidence of thrombosis for the affected individual):

- Unfractionated heparin (w/ warfarin)
- LMWH/Low molecular weight heparin
- Dabigatran
- Direct Factor Xa Inhibitors
- Graduated compressed stocking
- High degree of prophylaxis
