= Oklahoma Medical Research Foundation =

American nonprofit research institute

Coordinates: 35°28′58″N 97°29′50″W

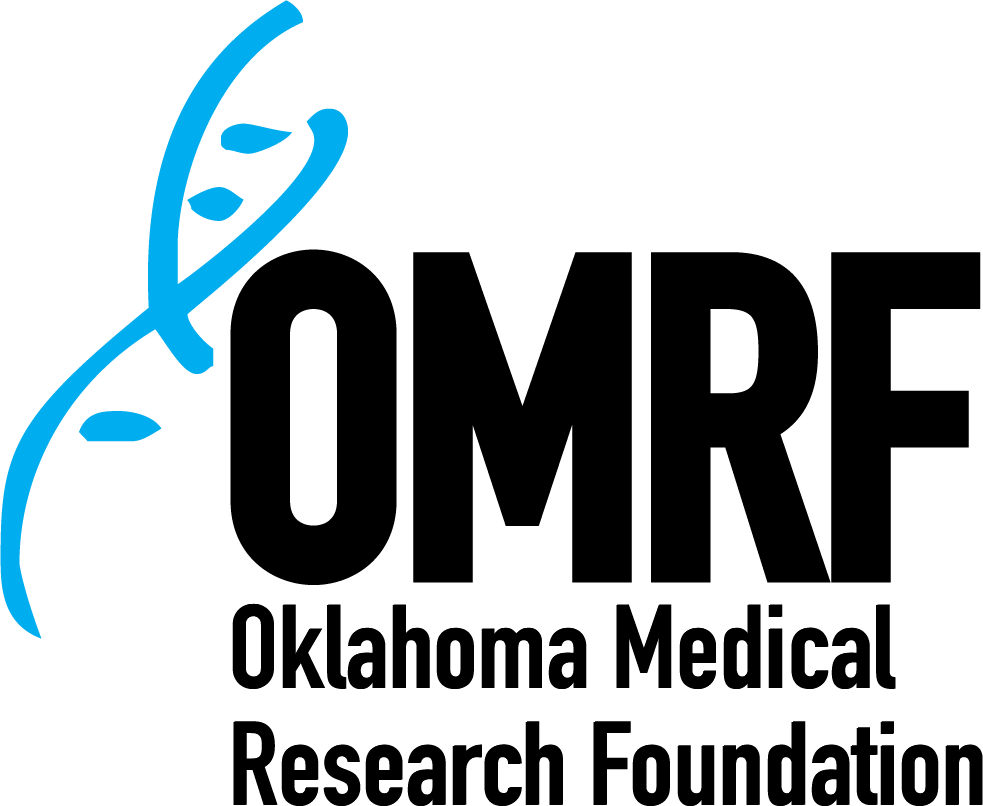
- Nickname: OMRF
- Formation: 1946; 80 years ago
- Type: Nonprofit organization, independent research institution
- Tax ID no.: 73-0580274
- Legal status: 501(c)3) Nonprofit Organization
- Purpose: Medical Research
- Headquarters: Oklahoma City, OK USA
- President: Andrew S. Weyrich, Ph.D.
- Budget: $92,338,587 USD
- Staff: 450
- Website: omrf.org

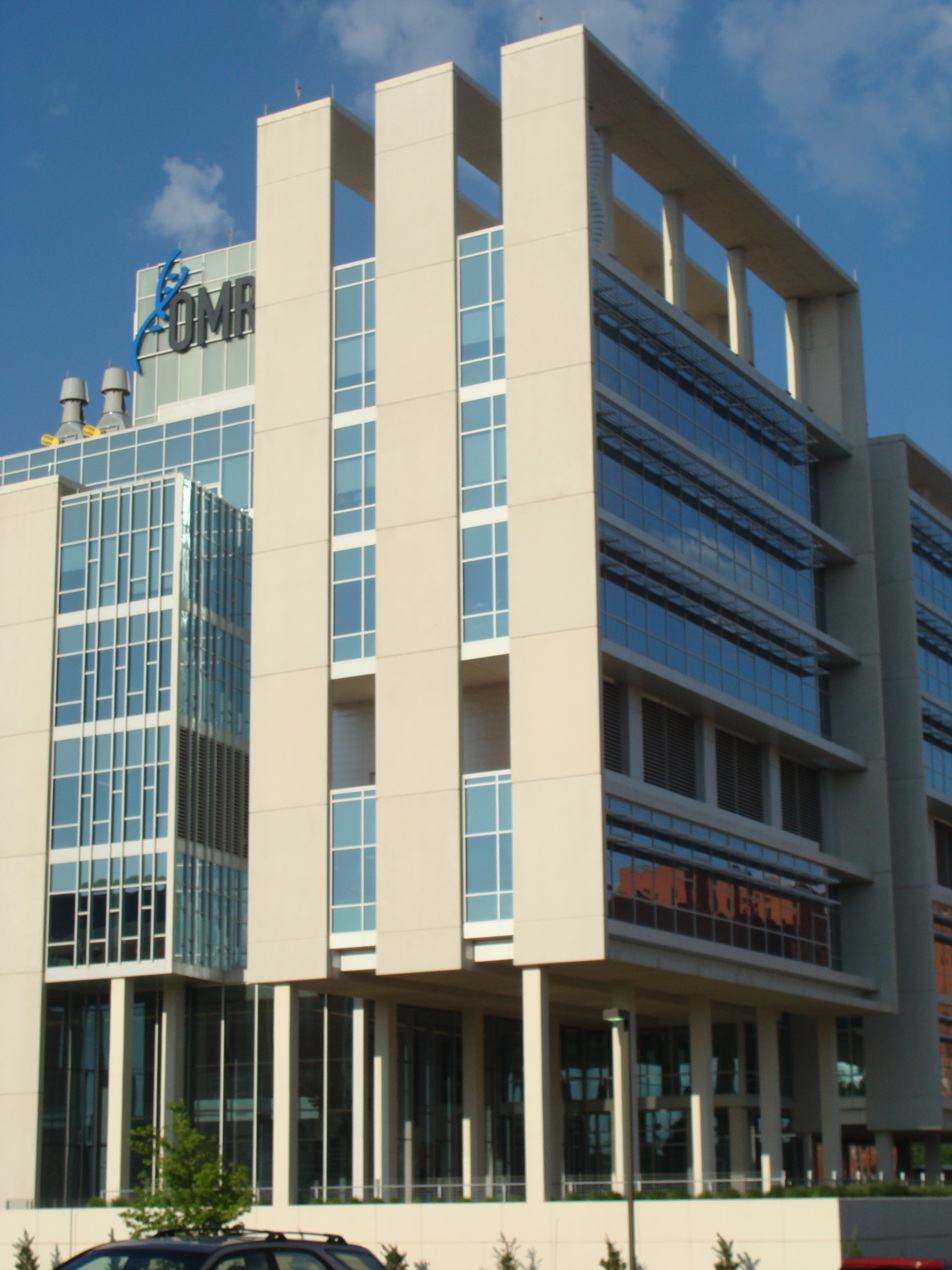

The Oklahoma Medical Research Foundation (OMRF), located in the Oklahoma Health Center in Oklahoma City, Oklahoma, is an independent, nonprofit biomedical research institute. Established in 1946, OMRF is dedicated to understanding and developing more effective treatments for human disease. Andrew S. Weyrich, Ph.D. serves as president of OMRF, which employs more than 500 scientific and administrative staff members.

OMRF's scientists, who include a member of the National Academy of Sciences, hold more than 700 U.S. and international patents and have spun off 11 biotech companies. Discoveries at OMRF led to Xigris, the first FDA-approved drug for the treatment of severe sepsis, and Ceprotin, a therapy for people suffering from a rare and life-threatening blood disorder known as protein C deficiency. Research at OMRF also identified the enzyme believed responsible for Alzheimer's disease and laid the groundwork for OncoVue, a breast cancer risk assessment test.

== History ==
Beginning from discussions among the alumni of the University of Oklahoma Medical School in 1944, several doctors began to develop the idea of an independent research organization adjacent to - but separate from - the medical school. Led by Dr. Mark R. Everett, a Harvard Medical School grad who rose from professor to become dean of the OU Medical School in 1947, they agreed on August 3, 1946, to incorporate as the Oklahoma Medical Research Foundation (OMRF), a private, nonprofit, independent research institution in Oklahoma City. In April 1947 Oklahoma's Governor, Roy J. Turner became general chair of a statewide fund drive for OMRF that spanned all 77 of Oklahoma's counties. By May 1949, 7,000 Oklahomans had donated and pledged $2.35 million, and construction of OMRF began.

The Foundation officially began operations on July 3, 1949. Sir Alexander Fleming, the British scientist who discovered penicillin, made his first visit to the United States to give the keynote address at the dedication. An estimated 2,500 people attended the ceremonies, where Fleming pronounced the future "bright," even though the first building was at the time, in the Nobel laureate's words, "just a big hole in the ground.". Dr. Edward C. Reifenstein Jr., became the foundation's first director.

OMRF opened the doors of its first building on Dec. 17, 1950. Since that time, OMRF has grown from 5 principal scientists to 50, and its staff has grown from roughly two dozen employees to almost 500. Securing more than $30 million annually in competitive research grants from the National Institutes of Health and other granting agencies, OMRF is a member of the Association of Independent Research Institutes. Its scientists focus on research in the areas of immunology, cardiovascular biology and diseases of aging.

== Research ==
OMRF conducts its research across five different divisions: Aging & Metabolism, Arthritis & Clinical Immunology, Cardiovascular Biology, Cell Cycle & Cancer Biology, and Genes & Human Disease.

=== Aging & Metabolism ===
In 2000, OMRF researchers created an inhibitor that, in vitro, stopped an enzyme thought to lead to progression of Alzheimer's disease. In 2007, OMRF researchers found evidence of a molecular mechanism that links a gene called “E4” to the onset of Alzheimer’s.

In 2023, OMRF researchers received a grant from the Alzheimer's Association to study the connection between estrogen and Alzheimer’s in postmenopausal women.

=== Cell Cycle & Cancer Biology ===
In 2001, OMRF researchers developed a test using prohibitin genotyping to assess breast cancer risk in women. In 2006, OMRF researchers demonstrated the reversibility of mitotic exit (cell division) in vertebrate cells.

=== Heart and blood diseases ===
In the 1980s, OMRF researchers studied protein C and developed a treatment for sepsis which utilized activated protein C.

=== Genes & Human Disease ===
In 1995, OMRF researchers established a national registry and data repository for studying the genetic causes of systemic lupus erythematosus.

== Education programs ==
In 1956, OMRF established its Sir Alexander Fleming Scholar Program, a summer research training program for Oklahoma high school and college students.

The 'Teen Leaders in Philanthropy' class was created in 2012 to let up to 40 high school sophomores, juniors and seniors develop hands-on leadership skills and an understanding of what a nonprofit organization does. The program gives participants a chance to learn from a variety of charitable organizations, donors and volunteers during nine sessions throughout the school year.

OMRF also provides the training ground for graduate and postdoctoral students each year in the M.D./Ph.D Program at the University of Oklahoma Medical School.

== Core facilities ==
OMRF maintains numerous core facilities, including:

- A 7-tesla MRI, which uses a 10,000-pound magnet to generate a magnetic field that is 140,000 times stronger than the earth's and allows researchers to study the cells and organs of genetically engineered living mice and rats at microscopic levels without harming the animals;
- BIACore to measure affinity and binding kinetics of macromolecular interactions;
- DNA Sequencing, with the daily capacity to run 90 sequences;
- Flow Cytometry, with three instruments: the FACScan and FACSCalibur cytometers, capable of three and four color fluorescence analyses, and the MoFlo cytometer capable of high throughput cell sorting.;
- Imaging, to assist researchers with imaging needs ranging from basic light and electron microscopy to digital image processing and analysis;
- In Situ Hybridization, including tissue sectioning, slide mounting, and hybridization histochemistry;
- Mouse Genome Manipulation Facility, providing microinjection services of DNA into zygotes for the generation of transgenic mice, and of ES cells into blastocysts for the generation of knockout mice;
- Molecular Biology Resource Facility, for protein and peptide sequencing and mass spectrometry analysis; and
- Signal Transduction Core, to assist research involving intracellular Ca2+ measurements and protein-protein interactions.

== In society ==
OMRF is funded through grants and independent contributions. One of the more unusual contributions is a share in the royalties of the musical Oklahoma!. Oklahoma born playwright Lynn Riggs wrote the original play, "Green Grow The Lilacs," on which the musical was based. Upon his death, he willed his 1% royalty to his 4 siblings. When his brother William Edgar Riggs died, OMRF received rights to that one-quarter share. As of the end of 2018, it has generated over $700,000 in earnings.
