= Endothelial protein C receptor =

Protein-coding gene in the species Homo sapiens

PROCR
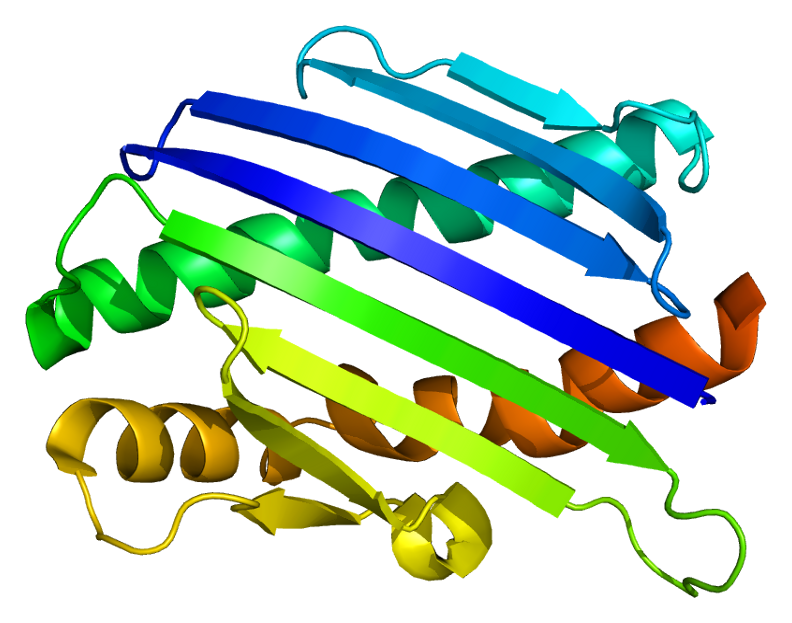

Identifiers
- Aliases: PROCR, CCCA, CCD41, EPCR, protein C receptor
- External IDs: OMIM: 600646; MGI: 104596; GeneCards: PROCR
Available structures
PDB	Ortholog search: PDBe RCSB
PDB	List of PDB id codes 1L8J, 1LQV, 3JTC, 4V3D, 4V3E

Gene location (Human)
Chr.	Chromosome 20 (human)
Band	20q11.22	Start	35,172,072 bp
Band	20q11.22	End	35,216,240 bp

Gene location (Mouse)
Chr.	Chromosome 2 (mouse)
Band	2|2 H1	Start	155,593,037 bp
Band	2|2 H1	End	155,597,391 bp
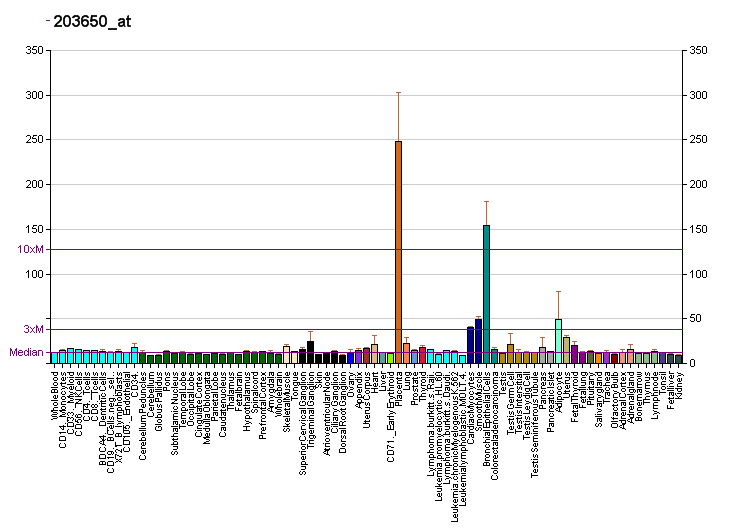
RNA expression pattern
Bgee	Human / Mouse (ortholog); Top expressed in: pericardium; germinal epithelium; tendon of biceps brachii; gastric mucosa; right coronary artery; parietal pleura; synovial joint; vena cava; left uterine tube; subcutaneous adipose tissue / Top expressed in: decidua; endothelial cell of lymphatic vessel; gastrula; lumbar spinal ganglion; semi-lunar valve; aortic valve; ascending aorta; ankle; iris; atrioventricular valve; More reference expression data
BioGPS	More reference expression data
Gene ontology
Molecular function	protein binding; signaling receptor activity
Cellular component	integral component of membrane; extracellular region; cell surface; centrosome; plasma membrane; integral component of plasma membrane; extracellular exosome; membrane; focal adhesion; extracellular space; perinuclear region of cytoplasm
Biological process	hemostasis; blood coagulation; leukocyte migration; negative regulation of coagulation
Sources:Amigo / QuickGO
Orthologs
Databases	NCBI: entry; OMA: entry
Species	Human	Mouse
Entrez	10544	19124
Ensembl	ENSG00000101000	ENSMUSG00000027611
UniProt	Q9UNN8	Q64695
RefSeq (mRNA)	NM_006404	NM_011171
RefSeq (protein)	NP_006395	NP_035301
Location (UCSC)	Chr 20: 35.17 – 35.22 Mb	Chr 2: 155.59 – 155.6 Mb
PubMed search
- Wikidata
View/Edit Human	View/Edit Mouse

Endothelial protein C receptor (EPCR) also known as activated protein C receptor (APC receptor) is a protein that in humans is encoded by the PROCR gene. PROCR has also recently been designated CD201 (cluster of differentiation 201).

EPCR is a transmembrane glycoprotein receptor that plays a crucial role in regulation of blood coagulation, inflammation, and vascular integrity. Its ability to enhance the anticoagulant activity of protein C, modulate inflammatory responses, and maintain endothelial barrier function highlights its importance in homeostasis maintenance.

The endothelial protein C receptor (EPCR) is a transmembrane glycoprotein which is encoded by the PROCR gene. EPCR is also known as the activated protein C receptor or CD201. EPCR was originally known for its role in the protein C anticoagulant pathway. In this pathway, EPCR helps regulate the formation of blood clots. It is expressed on endothelial cells which line the blood vessels. Research has shown that EPCR can also participate in the regulation of inflammation, survival of endothelial cells, vascular permeability and immune responses.

It functions as a receptor for protein C and activated protein C (APC) EPCR increases the efficiency of protein C activation by positioning protein C near the thrombin-thrombomodulin complex onto the endothelial cells. Once formed, APC decreases the coagulation by inactivating factor Va and factor VIIIa. APC initiates cytoprotective signaling by cleaving protease-activated receptor 1 (PAR1) which results in anti-inflammatory, preventing programmed cell death, and protecting the endothelial barrier.

EPCR is also important in a clinical sense, in infectious and inflammatory diseases. In severe Plasmodium falciparum malaria, the parasite proteins that are expressed on the infected red blood cells bind to EPCR and initiate sequestration in the small blood vessels. This can interfere with the protein C pathway and help with the endothelial cells becoming activated, inflammation, abnormalities in the coagulation cascade and vascular leakage.

== Structure ==
EPCR protein is an N-glycosylated type I membrane protein that enhances the activation of protein C. It belongs to the MHC class I/CD1 family of proteins, The structure of CD201 consists of an extracellular domain, a transmembrane domain, and a cytoplasmic tail. The extracellular domain of CD201 contains a high-affinity binding site for activated protein C (APC), a serine protease with anticoagulant properties. The binding site for APC resembles a deep groove with a lipid inside. The bound lipid in EPCR is usually phosphatidylcholine or phosphatidylethanolamine, and it contributes to APC binding.

CD201 is expressed on the surface of endothelial cells, which form the inner lining of blood vessels. CD201 has also been identified as hematopoietic stem cell (HSC) marker.

EPCR is encoded by the PROCR gene. The PROCR gene is located on chromosome 20. Structurally the protein belongs to the major histocompatibility complex class 1 and CD1 family of the family of proteins, but its primary function is not as an antigen presenting molecule. EPCR is a type I transmembrane protein that consists of an extracellular ligand-binding domain, a single membrane-spanning region and a short cytoplasmic tail.

Projecting from the endothelial cell surface, the extracellular domain contains the site responsible for binding protein C and APC. Through their gamma-carboxyglutamic acid (Gla) domain, both protein C and APC interact with EPCR. Occupied by a phospholipid, the extra cellular region of EPCR contains a hydrophobic groove. The hydrophobic groove contributes to the stability of the receptor and its ability to interact with ligands.

EPCR is anchored to the endothelial cell membrane by the transmembrane domain. The cytoplasmic tail is short and does not have a large intracellular signaling region. Because of the inadequate signaling region, EPCR often functions as a docking receptor rather than producing the intracellular signals on its own. EPCR's cytoprotective effects occur through the cooperation with other cell-surface receptors, particularly PAR1.

EPCR can interact with additional molecules, not just protein C and APC which are the best characterized EPCR ligands. Coagulation factor VII and factor VIIA, certain immune-cell proteins and the P. falciparum erythrocyte membrane protein 1 (PfEMP1) are other molecules the EPCR can interact with. EPCR's ability to bind different ligands has led EPCR to be described as a multi glanded and multifunctional receptor.

== Soluble EPCR ==
EPCR can go through a process called receptor shedding. Receptor shedding is when EPCR is released from the endothelial-cell surface from proteolytic cleavage. The releases portion is referred to as soluble EPCR (sEPCR). Metalloproteinase enzymes participate in this process, and it may increase during endothelial activation and inflammation.

Soluble EPCR has the ability to bind protein C and APC. It is no longer attached to the membrane, so it does not position protein C next to the thrombin-thrombomodulin complex. It may instead compete with the membrane EPCR for available protein C and APC which potentially could change their anticoagulant and cellular signaling functions.

In Inflammatory, thrombotic and vascular diseases changes in the circulating soluble EPCR have been studied. When the shedding increases, the amount of protective EPCR on the endothelial surface will decrease while the soluble receptor in the circulation increases. Soluble EPCR has been studied as a plausible indicator of endothelial activation or vascular dysfunction, however its exact clinical significance varies between disease settings.

== Physiological functions ==
The main function of CD201 is to enhance the activation of protein C. The binding of APC to EPCR on the endothelial cell surface facilitates its anticoagulant activity by inhibiting factors Va and VIIIa. Apart from its anticoagulant role, CD201 also participates in an anti-inflammatory signaling. CD201 has been shown to affect the production of inflammatory cytokines upon binding a coagulation factor VIIa.

Protein C is a plasma protein that is dependent on vitamin K and is produced mainly by the liver. As an inactive precursor or zymogen it circulates in the blood. Protein C is activated on the endothelial surface through interactions involving thrombin, thrombomodulin, and EPCR.

Thrombin is most commonly associated with promoting coagulation. Thrombin converts fibrinogen into fibrin which activates platelets and supports the clotting factor activation. When thrombin binds to thrombomodulin, its preferred substrate changes. The thrombin-thrombomodulin complex is able to convert protein C into activated protein C.

EPCR improves this process by binding circulating protein C and then positioning it near the thrombin-thrombomodulin complex. This increases the efficiency of protein C activation. The normal pathway is protein C binds EPCR, thrombin binds thrombomodulin, the complex activates protein C and then the activated protein C is formed.

Activated protein C acts as a natural anticoagulant. Together with cofactor protein S, APC can inactivate factor Va and VIIIa. This inactivation decreases the additional thrombin being generated and limits further formation of fibrin.

The protein C pathway prevents coagulating from spreading beyond the area where it is needed. This is also connected to inflammation because thrombin and other coagulation proteases influence endothelial and immune cell signaling. By decreasing excessive thrombin production, APC can also help limit coagulation and some inflammatory responses.

== Cytoprotective signaling ==
APC produces cytoprotective effects, which protects cells from injury and death. These are particularly important when endothelial cells are exposed to cytokines, oxidative stress, hypoxia or coagulation proteases.

Many of the cytoprotective effects of APC happen when APC is associated with EPCR and activates PAR1. PAR1 is a g-protein receptor that gets activated when a protease cleaves part of its extracellular region. Both thrombin and APC can act through PAR1 but the cellular outcomes can be different depending on the specific protease, receptor location and presence of EPCR.

Thrombin mediated PAR1 signaling is associated with endothelial activation, pro-inflammatory responses and increased vascular permeability. Signaling produced by EPCR bound APC is associated with cell survival, reduced apoptosis, decreased inflammatory activation and endothelial barrier is stabilized.

The ability of different proteases to produce effects through the same receptor is referred to as biased signaling. EPCR helps influence the signaling outcomes by organizing APC and PAR1 within particular regions of the endothelial membrane.

APC dependent signaling has been linked to intracellular pathways involving phosphoinositide 3- kinases and Akt, minitogen-activated protein kinases, Rac1 and sphingosine-1-phosphate receptors. These intracellular pathways support endothelial cell survival, regulate the cytoskeleton and strengthen cell to cell junctions. This APC signaling can also modify activation of the inflammatory transcription factor NF-𝜅B.

== Immunological functions ==
Regulation of inflammation

The endothelium participates in immune responses. When there is an infection or a tissue injury, the endothelial cells react to microbial molecules, coagulation factors and cytokines. These activated endothelial cells may increase vascular permeability, release inflammatory mediators and express adhesion molecules that attract leukocytes that are circulating.

EPCR dependent APC signaling can counterbalance endothelial activation when it becomes excessive. APC signaling through EPCR and PAR1 has been linked to a decrease in NF-𝜅B activity and also reduced production of the pro inflammatory mediators. NF-𝜅B is a transcription factor that controls the expression of chemokines, cytokines and adhesion molecules that are involved in inflammation.

Pro inflammatory cytokines that are associated with endothelial activation are interleukin-1 beta, interleukin-6 and tumor necrosis factor alpha. TNF-𝛼 promotes the endothelial activation and also increases the expression of the adhesion molecules. IL-1β is linked to fever, local inflammatory responses and the recruitment of leukocytes. IL-6 participates in the acute response and influences both innate and adaptive immunity.

APC-EPCR signaling does not necessarily suppress every cytokine directly in tissues. Instead, it is considered a pathway that regulates and reduces excessive inflammatory signaling, while limiting the activation of endothelial cells and protects tissues from inflammation-associated vascular injury.

Endothelial barrier protection

Endothelial cells control the movement of fluid, immune cells, and proteins between surrounding tissues and the bloodstream. During inflammation, endothelial junctions can become loosened, allowing the plasma proteins and leukocytes to enter the affected tissues. Although this response supports host defense, excessive permeability can cause reduced blood volume, edema, and organ dysfunction.

EPCR- associated APC signaling supports the endothelial barrier by influencing cell-survival, junctional organization and cytoskeletal activity. Activation of Rac1 and related pathways can help stabilize the endothelial junctions and decrease the contraction of abnormal cells. These changes can limit excessive vascular leakage while also still allowing controlled immune cell migration.

Organs with specialized microvascular systems like the brain, lungs, and kidneys need barrier protection. In the brain, the endothelial cells form the blood brain barrier which restricts the entry of circulating substances into nervous tissue. Disruption of this barrier may contribute to neurological complications when there are severe infections, including cerebral malaria.

Coagulation and innate immunity

EPCR contributes to the communication between coagulation and innate immunity. Inflammation and infection activate the tissue factor pathways, change endothelial cell behavior, and increase the production of thrombin. Increased amounts of thrombin can promote inflammation causing a cycle where inflammation enhances coagulation and coagulation enhances inflammation.

The EPCR-protein pathway acts as a counter regulatory system. EPCR helps inactivate factors Va and VIIIa and reduces thrombin generation by increasing APC production. APC-EPCR-PAR1 signaling protects endothelial cells, reduces excessive inflammatory activation, and maintains vascular integrity.

Unlike Toll-like receptors, EPCR is not a pattern recognition receptor and does not directly detect pathogens. Instead, the vascular response is regulated when there is infection by linking coagulation with inflammation and controlling the endothelial activation.

Regulation of leukocyte adhesion

During inflammation, endothelial adhesion molecules such as ICAM-1 and VCAM-1 regulate leukocyte attachment and migration into the tissues. Their expression is increased in response to inflammatory cytokines including TNF-𝛼 and IL-1β.

EPCR is not a primary leukocyte adhesion receptor, APC-EPCR signaling may decrease excessive endothelial activation and reduce adhesion molecule expression. EPCR can indirectly limit excessive leukocyte recruitment during inflammation.

Immune-mediated disease

EPCR and APC signaling have been studied in several inflammatory and immune-mediated diseases. The effects vary depending on the tissue, disease and cell type involved. In many endothelial cell models, EPCR signaling has anti-inflammatory effects, although additional roles have been observed in immune, stem and stromal cells.

A 2024 study examined EPCR and an engineered APC variant known as 3K3A-APC in a mouse model of allergic contact dermatitis.

Allergic contact dermatitis is a delayed type hypersensitivity reaction that involves antigen-presenting cells, activated T cells, leukocyte recruitment into the skin, and inflammatory cytokines. Reduced EPCR activity was associated with increased inflammation, while treatment with 3K3A-APC reduced inflammatory responses. Unlike normal APC, 3K3A-APC was designed to retain cytoprotective signaling while substantially reducing the anticoagulant activity, allowing the researchers to investigate its therapeutic potential with a lower risk of bleeding. These findings are preclinical and do not establish 3K2A-APC as an approved treatment. They support the continued investigation of EPCR dependent signaling in inflammatory skin disease and other immune mediated disorders.

== Role in malaria ==
EPCR binding by Plasmodium falciparum

Plasmodium falciparum is the malaria parasite that is most commonly associated with severe and cerebral malaria. During the blood stage of infection, the parasite develops inside red blood cells. Infected erythrocytes express parasite derived proteins that enable them to adhere to endothelial cells.

The primary adhesion protein is Plasmodium falciparum erythrocyte membrane protein 1 (PfEMP1). PfEMP1 proteins are encoded by a large family of highly variable var genes. By switching which PfEMP1 variant is being expressed, parasites can escape and hide from previously acquired antibody responses.

Cytoadhering allows infected erythrocytes to avoid the spleen from removing them. The accumulation of infected erythrocytes within the small blood vessels, which is sequestration, contributes to lowered blood flow, inflammation and endothelial activation.

Infected erythrocytes express PfEMP1, whose CIDR𝛼1 domain binds EPCR on the endothelial cells. This promotes sequestration within small blood vessels and helps infected erythrocytes avoid splenic clearance.

Inference with protein C signaling

Binding of PfEMP1 to EPCR does more than anchor infected erythrocytes. Because the parasite binds near the protein C/APC binding site, protein C activation and APC-mediated cytoprotective signaling is disrupted.

In normal conditions, protein C activation and protective APC-PAR1 signaling is supported by EPCR. During severe malaria, the parasites that occupy EPCR may decrease the protective functions while concentrating infected erythrocytes on the endothelial surface. Possible consequences include reduced APC signaling, decreased anticoagulant activity, loss of endothelial protection, increased thrombin generation, reduced protein C activation, increases inflammation, endothelial barrier disruption, microvascular coagulation.

Cerebral malaria

Cerebral malaria is a neurological complication of P. falciparum infection characterized by impaired consciousness or coma. Scientists believe cerebral malaria develops because of several different processes working together. Infected red blood cells stick inside tiny blood vessels in the brain; the blood vessel lining becomes inflamed and activated. The immune system responds to the infection by releasing cytokines and recruiting immune cells. This causes endothelial activation, inflammation, impaired blood flow in small vessels and disruption of the blood brain barrier.

EPCR-binding PfEMP1 is considered an important mechanism associated with sever and cerebral malaria. Host immune responses, parasite burden, variation in parasite adhesion and additional endothelial receptors all contribute to the severity of the disease.

Shabani and colleagues found that expression of EPCR-binding PfEMP1 increased malaria severity and was elevated in children with cerebral malaria, supporting an association between EPCR-binding parasite variants and severe disease.

Multiple endothelial receptors

Different endothelial receipts bind to different PfEMP1 domains, allowing the infected erythrocytes to stick under various vascular conditions. ICAM-1 binding is commonly mediated by DBLβ domains, while EPCR binding is primarily mediated by CIDRα1 domains. ICAM-1 serves as a receptor for indebted erythrocytes and also normally functions in leukocyte adhesion.

Dual receptor binding is enabled by PfEMP1 variants. The simultaneous binding to EPCR and ICAM-1 may strengthen the adhesion and contribute to sequestration within the cerebral microvasculature.

DC8 and DC13 domain cassettes

PfEMP1 proteins have recurring groups of domains, these are known as domain cassettes. DC8 and DC13 are commonly associated with EPCR binding.

DC8 and DC13 contain EPCR binding CIDRα1 domains and have been linked to severe malaria. Several variants also contain domains capable of binding to ICAM-1, which then increases their adhesive properties.

Azasi and colleagues demonstrated that infected erythrocytes that are intact, expressing DC13 PfEMP1 may act differently from isolated recombinant protein domains. This suggests that protein orientation, membrane organization, multiple receptor interaction, and neighboring domains all influence the adhesion of parasites.

Adaptive immunity

Repeated exposure to malaria gradually produces partial immunity. Reinfections remains possible, but naturally acquired immunity decreases the risk of severe disease. Antibodies against PfEMP1 and other infected erythrocyte surface antigens contribute to this immunity.

Turner and colleagues found that antibodies against EPCR binding CIDRα1 domains occur early during repeated malaria exposure.

These antibodies may block PfEMP1 binding to EPCR or promote the clearance of infected erythrocytes by phagocytic immune cells. Not all antibodies have that equal protection.

PfEMP1 diversity and continual switching of var gene expression which allows parasites to escape existing antibody responses, making vaccine development challenging.

EPCR binding PfEMP1 domains are remaining promising vaccine targets because they are associated with severe malaria and may contain conserved regions recognized by broadly protective antibodies.

== Clinical significance ==
CD201 is gaining recognition as a marker in patients with acute infections as well as in patients with vascular diseases. Recently, CD201 has been studied in relationship with rheumatoid arthritis.

In a recent study on emergency granulopoiesis, it has been observed that CD201 is highly expressed on lymphoid-biased HSCs under steady-state conditions. However, during emergency granulopoiesis, the loss of CD201 marked a transcriptional switch from a lymphoid to a myeloid identity in HSCs. These findings suggest that CD201 is involved in the regulation of the response to acute infection. As with many signaling molecules, the context of their effect matters. It has been mentioned above that CD201 has anti-inflammatory properties during coagulation. However, in a rheumatoid arthritis (RA) murine model it has been shown that CD201 knock-out (KO) mice had 40% lower arthritis incidence and 50% less disease severity compared to wild-type (WT) mice. CD201 KO mice also had significantly fewer Th1/Th17 cells in synovial tissues, which implies that CD201 may play a role in the regulation of immune cell populations involved in the pathogenesis of RA.

The importance of CD201 as a clinical marker has been demonstrated in another study where decreased patient serum levels of CD201 have been associated with vascular dysfunctions.

EPCR is clinically significant because it links coagulation, immune regulation and endothelial regulation. When there is altered EPCR expression, disrupted ligand binding, or increased shedding may increase vascular permeability, enhance inflammatory signaling and may impar protein C activation.

There are potential therapeutic strategies that include enhancing APC-mediated cytoprotective signaling, preserving endothelial EPCR depression, and developing engineered APC variants such as 3K3A-APC, which maintain protective signaling while reducing bleeding risk.

In malaria, the current research focuses on developing antibodies against CIDRα1 domains, preserving normal protein C signaling, and blocking PfEMP1-EPCR interactions. However, the complex pathogenesis of severe malaria and the remarkable diversity of PfEMP1 continues to present challenges for vaccine development and therapy.
