= Protein C inhibitor =

Human protein

SERPINA5
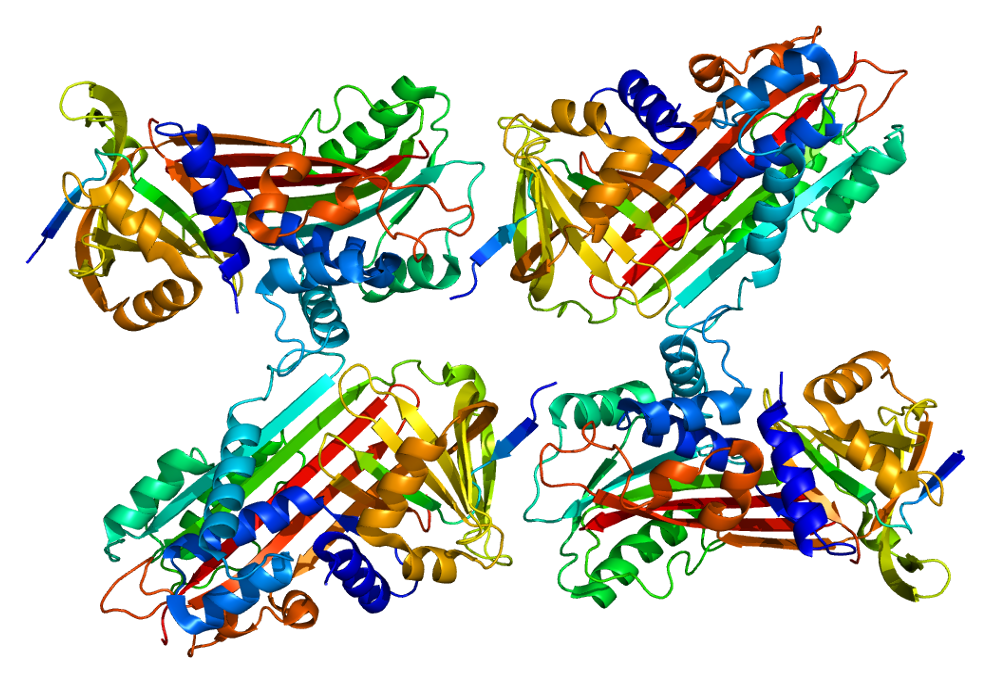

Identifiers
- Aliases: SERPINA5, PAI-3, PAI3, PCI, PCI-B, PLANH3, PROCI, serpin family A member 5
- External IDs: OMIM: 601841; MGI: 107817; GeneCards: SERPINA5
Available structures
| PDB | Ortholog search: PDBe RCSB |
| PDB | List of PDB id codes 3DY0, 1LQ8, 2HI9, 2OL2 |

Gene location (Human)
| Chr. | Chromosome 14 (human) |
| Band | 14q32.13 | Start | 94,561,442 bp |
| Band | 14q32.13 | End | 94,593,118 bp |

Gene location (Mouse)
| Chr. | Chromosome 12 (mouse) |
| Band | 12|12 E | Start | 104,067,372 bp |
| Band | 12|12 E | End | 104,072,396 bp |
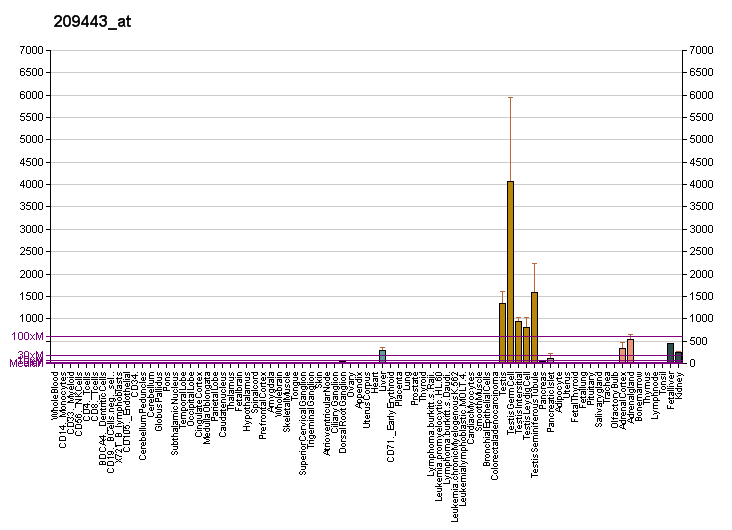
RNA expression pattern
| Bgee | Human / Mouse (ortholog); Top expressed in: right adrenal cortex; right testis; left testis; left adrenal cortex; gallbladder; seminal vesicula; right lobe of liver; body of pancreas; human kidney; spleen / Top expressed in: spermatocyte; epithelium of bronchiole; seminiferous tubule; urethra; spermatid; Gonadal ridge; mucosa of large intestine; embryo; epithelium of anal canal; mucosa of esophagus; More reference expression data |
| BioGPS | More reference expression data |
Gene ontology
| Molecular function | peptidase inhibitor activity; retinoic acid binding; heparin binding; phosphatidylcholine binding; glycosaminoglycan binding; acrosin binding; protease binding; protein binding; serine-type endopeptidase inhibitor activity |
| Cellular component | platelet alpha granule; protein C inhibitor-TMPRSS11E complex; platelet dense tubular network; protein C inhibitor-plasma kallikrein complex; membrane; protein C inhibitor-PLAU complex; protein C inhibitor-coagulation factor Xa complex; acrosomal membrane; protein C inhibitor-thrombin complex; protein C inhibitor-coagulation factor XI complex; extracellular region; protein C inhibitor-KLK3 complex; protein C inhibitor-coagulation factor V complex; protein C inhibitor-TMPRSS7 complex; protein C inhibitor-PLAT complex; extracellular exosome; external side of plasma membrane; extracellular space; protein-containing complex; collagen-containing extracellular matrix |
| Biological process | negative regulation of proteolysis; fusion of sperm to egg plasma membrane involved in single fertilization; negative regulation of peptidase activity; lipid transport; blood coagulation; negative regulation of hydrolase activity; single fertilization; spermatogenesis; negative regulation of endopeptidase activity; seminal vesicle development; transport |
Sources:Amigo / QuickGO
Orthologs
| Databases | NCBI: entry; OMA: entry |
| Species | Human | Mouse |
| Entrez | 5104 | 268591 |
| Ensembl | ENSG00000188488 | ENSMUSG00000041550 |
| UniProt | P05154 | P70458 |
| RefSeq (mRNA) | NM_000624 | NM_172953 |
| RefSeq (protein) | NP_000615 | NP_766541 |
| Location (UCSC) | Chr 14: 94.56 – 94.59 Mb | Chr 12: 104.07 – 104.07 Mb |
| PubMed search |
- Wikidata
| View/Edit Human | View/Edit Mouse |

Protein C inhibitor (PCI, SERPINA5) is a serine protease inhibitor (serpin) that limits the activity of protein C (an anticoagulant).

An N-terminal fragment of PCI is a possible serum biomarker for prostate cancer.

Protein C inhibitor is activated by heparin against thrombin.

Protein C inhibitor (PCI) is serine protease inhibitor of serpin type that is found in most tissues and fluids, including blood plasma, seminal plasma and urine of human. It is a 52kD glycoprotein and belongs to serine protease inhibitor ( Serpin) super family of protein. In the beginning protein C Inhibitor (PCI) was identified as an inhibitor of activated protein C (APC), it is currently clear that this inhibitor has an expansive specificity, inhibiting several blood coagulation enzymes counting thrombin and factor Xa.

== Isolation ==
In the beginning, protein C inhibitor(PCI) was originally identified in human plasma by Griffin and Marlar and first isolation was performed by Suzuki et al. Protein C inhibitor (PCI) can be isolated from human plasma using an ordinary chromatographic procedure consisting of barium citrate adsorption, polyethylene glycol fractionation, DEAE-Sepharose CL-6B treatment, ammonium sulfate fractionation, dextran sulfate-agarose chromatography, gel filtration on ACA-44, and DEAE-Sephacel chromatography.

== Structure ==
The structure (primary structure) of protein C inhibitor was deduced from its cDNA nucleotide sequence. The human Protein C inhibitor have 19 amino acid signal peptide.

== Gene organization ==
The study of genomic DNA by restriction mapping, polymerase chain reaction analysis and DNA sequencing showed the gene being 11.5 kilobases in length, consisting of five exons separated by four introns. The genetic code of protein C inhibitor is similar to alpha 1-antitrypsin and alpha 1-antichymotrypsin.

== Metabolism ==
The in vivo half time degradation of protein C inhibitor in plasma is found to be 23 hours, whereas the half time degradation of protein C inhibitor and protein C complex is 20 minutes.

== Binding with heparin ==
Protein C inhibitors have ability to inhibit protein C, thrombin and other enzymes that are stimulated by heparin. The heparin binding site of protein C inhibitor is from 264-283 region. Heparin enhances the rate of inhibition leading to the conformational change in the structure of Protein C and other proteases. The binding site of heparin is different for protein C inhibitor and other proteases Heparin regulates the protein C inhibitor (PCI) activity and furthermore its specificity in those system where there is presence of two or more target proteases.

== Clinical significance ==
=== As an antimicrobial agent ===
Protein C inhibitor interacts with lipid membrane subsequently leading to permeabilization of bacterial pathogen exerting the antimicrobial activity. Protein C inhibitor a potent antimicrobial agent that have ability to destroy the bacterial cell wall, causing death of the bacteria.

=== Reproduction ===
Protein C inhibitor significantly reduces fertilization by inhibiting both the binding and penetration of zona free hamster oocytes by human sperm. This effect of PCI is dose dependent as 0.04MicroM PCI inhibited 50% binding and penetration ability.

=== Inhibition of tumor growth ===
PCI communicated by malignant cells smothers tumor invasion by hindering urokinase-sort plasminogen activator, and restrains tumor development and metastasis which is independent of its protease inhibitory activity.

== Deficiency ==
Deficiency of protein C inhibitor in the human body may cause male infertility. Protein C inhibitor has a role in reproduction as it has ability to inhibit the sperm protease acrosin. Large amounts of protein C inhibitor circulate in the male reproductive organ as a plasma protein. Either deficiency or the presence of inactive protein C inhibitor can lead to male caused infertility.

== Interactions ==
Protein C inhibitor has often been shown to interact with prostate specific antigen, protein C and PLAU.

== See also ==
- Serpins
- Activated protein C–protein C inhibitor
