= Acrosin =

Mammalian protein found in Homo sapiens

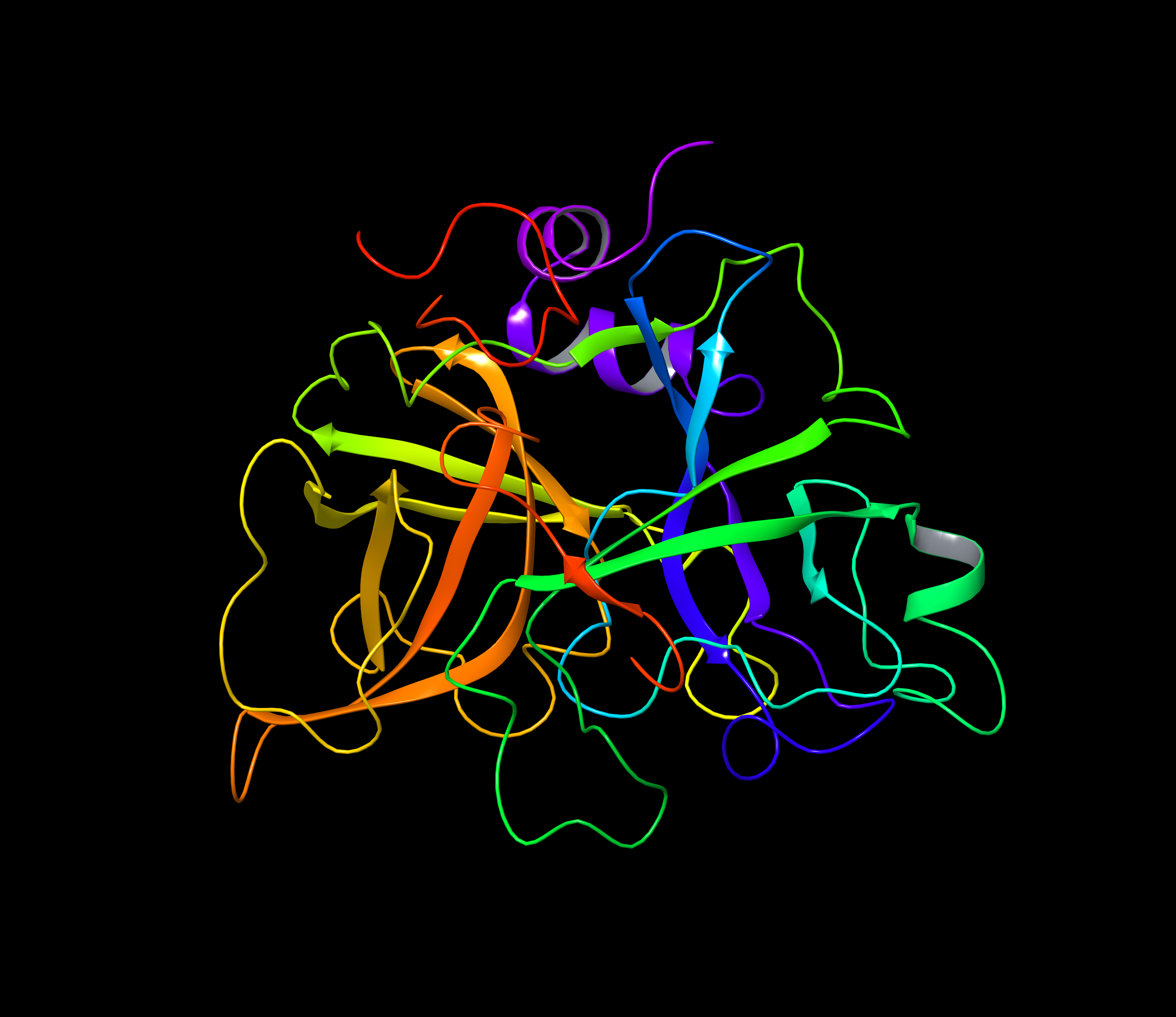

Identifiers
- EC no.: 3.4.21.10
- CAS no.: 9068-57-9

Databases
- BRENDA: enzyme data
- ExPASy: NiceZyme view
- KEGG: enzyme entry
- MetaCyc: metabolic pathway
- Rhea: reactions
- PDB structures: RCSB PDB PDBe PDBsum
- Gene Ontology: AmiGO / QuickGO
Search
- PMC: articles
- PubMed: articles
- NCBI: proteins

Acrosin is a digestive enzyme that acts as a protease. In humans, acrosin is encoded by the ACR gene. Acrosin is released from the acrosome of spermatozoa as a consequence of the acrosome reaction. It aids in the penetration of the Zona Pellucida.

== Enzyme Mechanism ==
Acrosin is a typical serine proteinase with trypsin-like specificity.

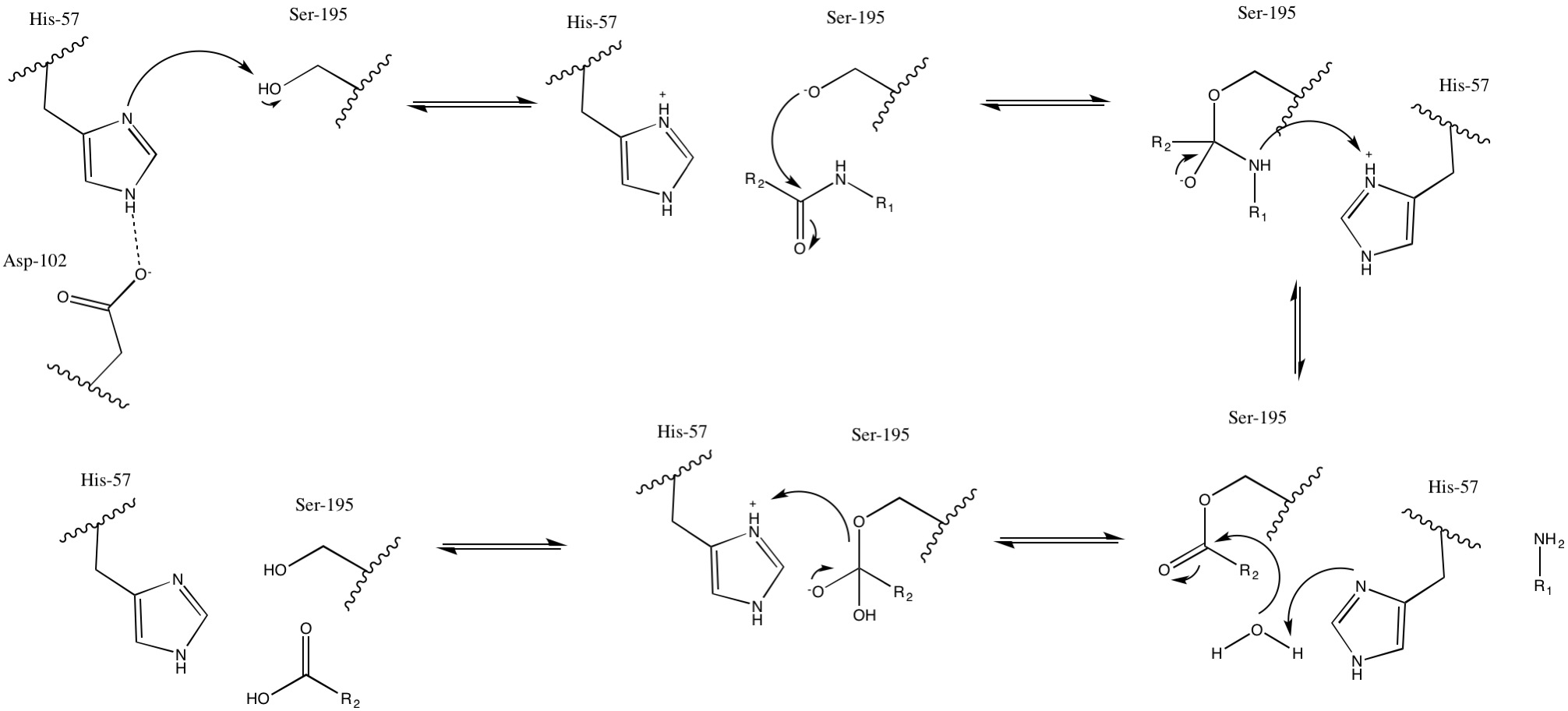
Acrosin catalytic mechanism

The reaction proceeds according to the usual serine protease mechanism. First, His-57 deprotonates Ser-195, allowing it to serve as a nucleophile. Deprotonated Ser-195 then reacts with the carbonyl carbon of a peptide, forming a tetrahedral intermediate. The tetrahedral intermediate then collapses, resulting in an H_{2}N-R_{1} leaving group, which is protonated through His-57. Finally, His-57 deprotonates a water molecule, which can then serve as a nucleophile by similarly reacting with the carbonyl carbon. Collapse of the tetrahedral intermediate then results in a Ser-195 leaving group, which is protonated through His-57, resulting in all residues returned to their pre-catalytic state, and a carboxylic acid where there was previously a peptide bond.

== Biological Function ==
Acrosin is the major proteinase present in the acrosome of mature spermatozoa. It is stored in the acrosome in its precursor form, proacrosin. Upon stimulus, the acrosome releases its contents onto the zona pellucida. After this reaction occurs, the zymogen form of the protease is then processed into its active form, β-acrosin. The active enzyme then functions in the lysis of the zona pellucida, thus facilitating penetration of the sperm through the innermost glycoprotein layers of the ovum.

The importance of acrosin in the acrosome reaction has been contested. It has been found through genetic knockout experiments that mouse spermatozoa lacking β-acrosin (the active protease) still have the ability to penetrate the zona pellucida. Thus, some argue for its role in assisting in the dispersal of acrosomal contents following the acrosome reaction, while others demonstrate evidence for its role as a secondary binding protein between the spermatozoa and zona pellucida. Under the secondary binding protein hypothesis, acrosin could serve a role in binding to molecules on the zona pellucida, tethering the spermatozoa to the egg. This "tethering" would ensure penetration due to the applied motile force of the spermatozoa.

Acrosin regulation has been found to occur through protein C inhibitor (PCI). PCI is present in the male reproductive tract at 40x higher concentrations than in blood plasma. PCI has been demonstrated to inhibit the proteolytic activity of acrosin. Thus, PCI has been hypothesized to have a protective role: if acrosomal enzymes were released prematurely, or if the spermatozoa was degenerated within the male reproductive tract, the high concentrations of PCI would inhibit acrosin from inflicting proteolytic damage on nearby tissues.

== Structure ==
β-acrosin demonstrates a high degree of sequence identity (70-80%) between boar, bull, rat, guinea pig, mouse, and human isoforms. There exists a somewhat similar (27-35%) sequence identity between β-acrosin and other serine proteases such as trypsin and chymotrypsin. While most serine proteases are activated through one cleavage event, proacrosin requires processing at both the N and C-terminal domains. Proacrosin is first cleaved between Arg-22 and adjacent Valine to create a 22 residue light chain, and an active protease termed α-acrosin. This light chain remains associated with the heavy chain, cross-linked through two disulfide bonds to form a heterodimer. Following these N-terminal cleavage events, three cleavages at the C-terminal domain removes 70 residues, yielding β-acrosin. Acrosin has two sites which have been identified as possible N-glycosylation sites: Asn-2 and Asn-169.

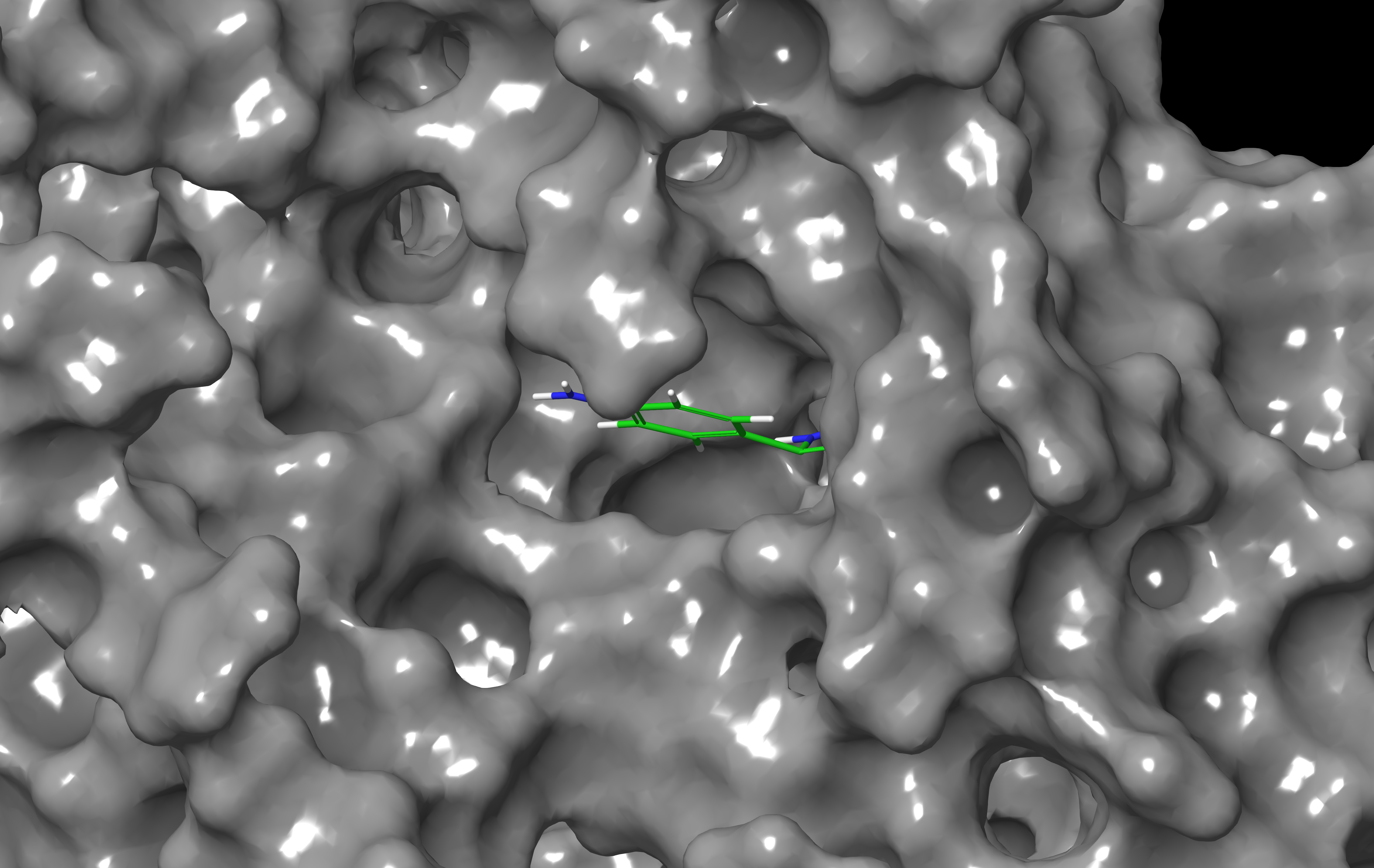
Acrosin active site surface contour, shown with competitive inhibitor benzamidine. Trp-215 "gatekeeper" residue is shown partially occluding the "top" (as pictured here) entrance to the binding cavity.

The catalytic triad consists of residues His-57, Asp-102, and Ser-195. These residues are found in a binding pocket that has been termed the "S1" pocket, consistent with the naming scheme that has been adopted for other proteases. The S1 pocket regulates acrosin's specificity for Arg and Lys substrates, with a conserved Trp-215 serving as a "gatekeeper" residue for the binding site entrance.

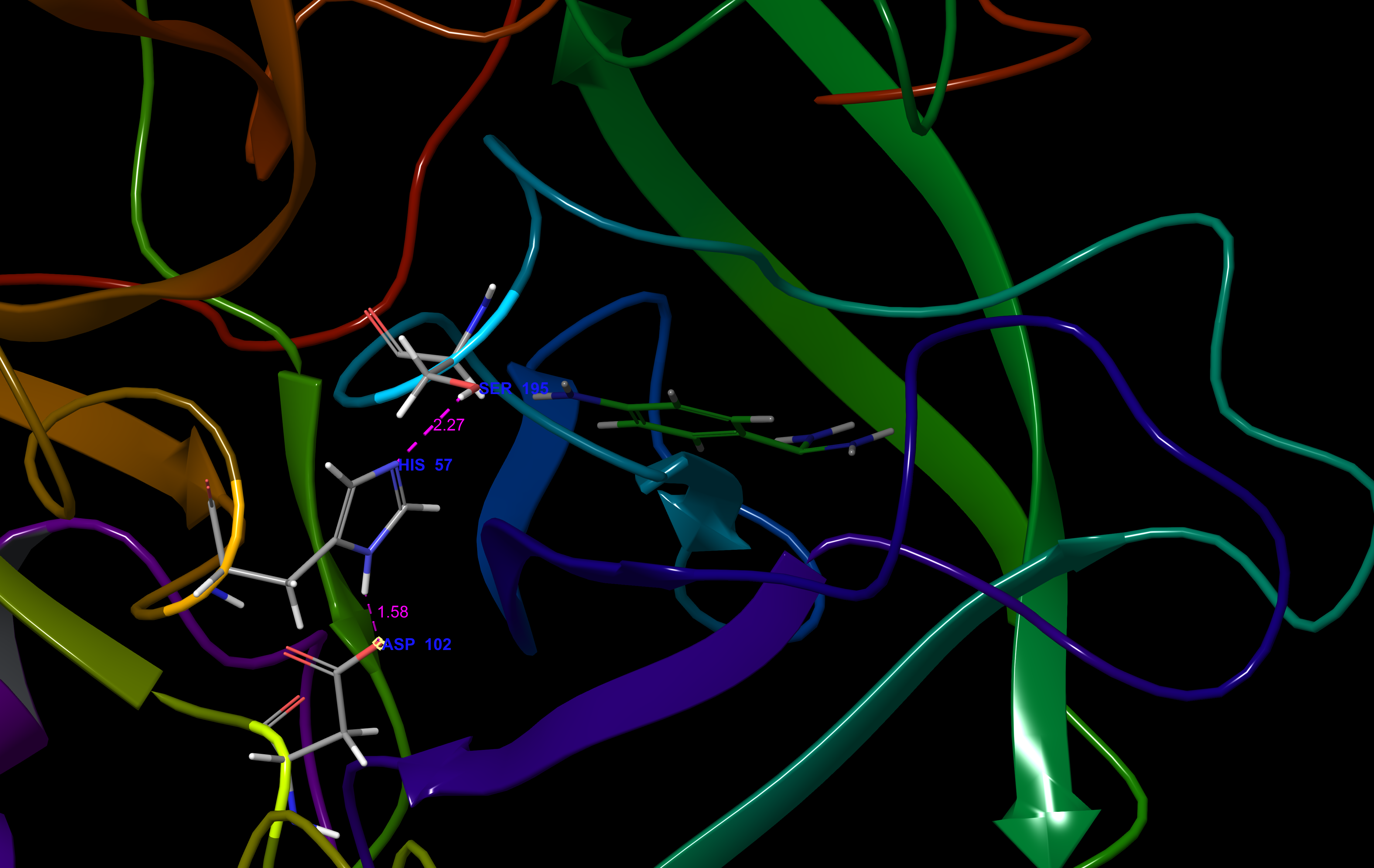
Acrosin active site residues, shown with competitive inhibitor benzamidine.

An important structural element of β-acrosin is a highly charged patch (formed through both amino acids and post-translational modifications) on its surface region, that has been termed the "anion binding exosite." This site consists of an area of excess positive charge, which has been hypothesized to be important in binding to the matrix of the zona pellucida, a heavily glycosylated and sulfated region with excess negative charge. This structural feature is consistent with the secondary binding protein hypothesis, as charge-charge interactions would stabilize a protein-zona pellucida "tethering" complex. Further consistent with this structural hypothesis is the knowledge that suramin - a polysulfated drug (with substantial corresponding negative charge) has been found to inhibit sperm-zona pellucida binding.

== Disease and Pharmaceutical Relevance ==
While one study which utilized mice models indicated that acrosin is not a necessary component of zona pellucida penetration, other studies in humans have shown an association between low acrosomal proteinase activity and infertility. Other research groups have demonstrated a significant correlation between acrosin activity and sperm motility. In rabbit models, an intravaginal contraceptive device that secreted tetradecyl sodium sulfate, a known inhibitor of acrosin and hyaluronidases, had a complete contraceptive effect. Although its exact mechanism of action is not entirely clear, acrosin could thus serve as a novel target for contraceptive agents. Acrosin may represent as a uniquely druggable target due to its location and high cellular specificity. Thus, developing inhibitors of acrosin could provide the basis for safe, reversible male contraceptives, or female contraceptives through the use of intravaginal contraceptive devices.

Moreover, as serine proteases are important in the potentiation of HIV, research has found that an acrosin inhibitor, 4'-acetamidophenyl 4-guanidinobenzoate, possess the ability to inhibit HIV infection in virus-inoculated lymphocytes. This suggests the further role of acrosin inhibitors as potentially viable agents in the prevention of HIV transmission.
