= Activated protein C–protein C inhibitor =

Activated protein C–protein C inhibitor (APC-PCI) is a complex of activated protein C (APC) and protein C inhibitor (PCI). It has been measured in coagulation testing to evaluate coagulation, thrombosis, and other cardiovascular complications. It is a marker of thrombin generation and indicates hypercoagulability or presence of thrombosis.

== Biochemistry ==
Activated Protein C is a vitamin K-dependent serine protease that cleaves and inactivates Factor Va and Factor VIIIa, thus acting as an anticoagulant. Protein C Inhibitor is a 54-kilodalton glycoprotein of the serpin superfamily. Like other serpins, upon cleavage by PC, PCI undergoes a dramatic conformational rearrangement resulting in a stable covalent bond between the two proteins. The resulting PC-PCI protein dimer lacks enzyme activity and is permanently inactivated, an example of suicide inhibition. Formation of this complex is one of the major means of regulation of protein C activity, so that pro-coagulation and anticoagulant activities are kept in balance.

== Clinical Significance ==
=== Marker of Coagulation Activation ===
The APC–PCI complex serves as a sensitive and specific biomarker for activated coagulation. Elevated levels of the complex are observed in a range of thrombosis conditions such as deep vein thrombosis, pulmonary embolism, and disseminated intravascular coagulation.

=== Diagnostic applications ===
In conjunction with other markers like thrombin-antithrombin (TAT) complexes, D-dimer, and prothrombin fragment 1+2 (F1+2), APC–PCI levels can provide information about vascular endothelial function. APC-PCI levels also can be used to monitor for thrombophilia post-surgery or during pregnancy. Notably, third-generation combined oral contraceptives cause significantly elevated levels of APC–PCI compared to those using second-generation formulations, suggesting elevated thrombotic risk.
