= Purpura fulminans =

- Other names: purpura gangrenosa
- Specialty: Infectious diseases

Purpura fulminans is an acute, often fatal, thrombotic disorder which manifests as blood spots, bruising and discolouration of the skin resulting from coagulation in small blood vessels within the skin and rapidly leads to skin necrosis and disseminated intravascular coagulation.

== Causes ==
Purpura fulminans is caused by defects in the protein C anticoagulant pathway. Identification of the cause of purpura fulminans often depends on the patient's age and circumstances of presentation.

=== Congenital protein C deficiency ===
Congenital (inherited) defects in protein C activity are autosomal dominant and may consist of partial or severe loss of function. Hundreds of natural mutations of the protein C gene (PROC) have been identified.

=== Acquired protein C deficiency ===
Acquired protein C deficiency is caused by either depletion of available protein C in plasma or decreased protein C synthesis (caused by administration of vitamin K antagonists, severe liver failure or complications of prematurity).

=== Severe acute sepsis ===
Purpura fulminans is a presenting feature of severe acute sepsis, including cases caused by Neisseria meningitidis, Streptococcus pneumoniae and Group A or B streptococcal infections, and less commonly with Haemophilus influenzae, Staphylococcus aureus, Capnocytophaga canimorsus or Plasmodium falciparum (malaria) infections, particularly in individuals with asplenia.

=== Combination of sepsis and partial congenital defect ===
In some cases, a combination of sepsis and a partial congenital defect in the protein C anticoagulant pathway initiates purpura fulminans.

=== Unknown ===
In rare instances, purpura fulminans is an autoimmune manifestation against protein C or protein S after normally benign infections, such as chicken pox. Sometimes purpura fulminans has unknown cause.

== Pathophysiology ==
Regardless of the underlying cause of purpura fulminans, the mechanism of disease is similar with deficiency in protein C concentration or decrease in protein C activity which promotes blood clotting (thrombosis).

In cases of severe sepsis, there is widespread activation of the acute systemic inflammatory response, including activation of the coagulation and complement pathways, as well as endothelial dysfunction. Activated protein C helps regulate the systemic inflammatory response. During sepsis, signalling by the inflammatory cytokines, interleukin-1 and tumour necrosis factor, mediate altered protein transcription in the systemic inflammatory response, resulting in decreased synthesis of the regulatory proteins antithrombin, protein C and protein S, with increased synthesis of prothrombotic proteins Factor VIII, von Willebrand factor, and fibrinogen. Activated protein C binds to endothelial protein C receptor and subsequently cleaves the endothelial cell protease activated receptor-1, not only altering coagulation profiles but down-regulating pro-inflammatory and pro-apoptotic mediators, up-regulation of anti-inflammatory and anti-apoptotic pathways and stabilization of the endothelial cell barrier functions.

Systemic coagulation activation may lead to depletion of circulating coagulation factors and platelets, which subsequently lead to bleeding. In early purpura fulminans, lesion progression correlates with the histological appearance of blockage of small skin blood vessels with blood clots causing capillary dilation and congestion with red blood cells. In later stage lesions, there is irreversible endothelial ischaemic injury with extravasation of blood cells into the dermis and gangrenous necrosis, sometimes with secondary infection.

The depletion of anticoagulant and anti-inflammatory proteins, in particular, protein C and its co-factor, protein S, may also promote thrombus formation, inhibit fibrinolysis and lead to further activation of the inflammatory pathways.

== Diagnosis ==
Early purpura fulminans lesions look similar to traumatic skin bleeds or purpuric rashes, such as immune thrombocytopenic purpura or thrombotic thrombocytopenic purpura; however, purpura fulminans will rapidly progress to necrosis whereas other purpuric rashes do not. In most cases, differential diagnoses may be distinguished from purpura fulminans by other clinical and laboratory findings.

The initial appearance of purpura fulminans lesions is of well-demarcated erythematous lesions which progress rapidly to develop irregular central areas of blue-black haemorrhagic necrosis. Advancing areas of necrosis are often surrounded by a thin border of erythaema that fades into adjacent unaffected skin. Haemorrhage into the necrotic skin causes purpura fulminans lesions to become painful, dark and raised, sometimes with vesicle or blister (bulla) formation.

The distribution of purpura fulminans lesions may be different according to the underlying pathogenesis. Purpura fulminans in severe sepsis typically develops in the distal extremities and progresses proximally or appears as a generalised or diffuse rash affecting the whole body surface. In cases of severe inheritable protein C deficiency, purpura fulminans with disseminated intravascular coagulation manifests within a few hours or days after birth.

=== Laboratory investigations ===
The cardinal features of purpura investigations are the same as those of disseminated intravascular coagulation: prolonged plasma clotting times, thrombocytopenia, reduced plasma fibrinogen concentration, increased plasma fibrin-degradation products and occasionally microangiopathic haemolysis.

== Prevention ==
For people who have severe congenital protein C deficiency, protein C replacement therapies are available, which is indicated and approved for use in the United States and Europe for the prevention of purpura fulminans. Protein C replacement is often in combination with anticoagulation therapy of injectable low molecular weight heparin or oral warfarin. Before initiating warfarin therapy, a few days of therapeutic heparin may be administered to prevent warfarin necrosis and other progressive or recurrent thrombotic complications.

=== Complications of prevention ===
The amount of fresh frozen plasma required to reverse disseminated intravascular coagulation associated with purpura fulminans may lead to complications of fluid overload and death, especially in neonates, such as transfusion-related acute lung injury. Exposure to multiple plasma donors over time increases the cumulative risk for transfusion-associated viral infection and allergic reaction to donor proteins found in fresh frozen plasma.

Allergic reactions and alloantibody formation are also potential complications, as with any protein replacement therapy.

Concomitant warfarin therapy in subjects with congenital protein C deficiency is associated with an increased risk of warfarin skin necrosis.

== Treatment ==
Early stage sepsis-associated purpura fulminans may be reversible with quick therapeutic intervention. Treatment is mainly removing the underlying cause and degree of clotting abnormalities and with supportive treatment (antibiotics, volume expansion, tissue oxygenation, etc.). Thus, treatment includes aggressive management of the septic state.

Purpura fulminans with disseminated intravascular coagulation should be urgently treated with fresh frozen plasma (10–20 mL/kg every 8–12 hours) and/or protein C concentrate to replace pro-coagulant and anticoagulant plasma proteins that have been depleted by the disseminated intravascular coagulation process.

Protein C in plasma in the steady state has a half life of 6- to 10-hour, therefore, patients with severe protein C deficiency and presenting with purpura fulminans can be treated acutely with an initial bolus of protein C concentrate 100 IU/kg followed by 50 IU /kg every 6 hours. A total of 1 IU/kg of protein C concentrate or 1 mL/kg of fresh frozen plasma will increase the plasma concentration of protein C by 1 IU/dL. Cases with comorbid pathological bleeding may require additional transfusions with platelet concentrate (10–15 mL/kg) or cryoprecipitate (5 mL/kg).

Established soft tissue necrosis may require surgical removal of the dead tissue, fasciotomy, amputation or reconstructive surgery.

== Prognosis ==
Purpura fulminans lesions, once established, often progress within 24 to 48 hours to full-thickness skin necrosis or soft-tissue necrosis. Once purpura fulminans lesions progress to full-thickness skin necrosis, healing takes between 4–8 weeks and leaves large scars.

Without treatment, necrotic soft tissue may become gangrenous, leading to loss of limbs. Purpura fulminans is often accompanied by micro-vascular thrombosis and haemorrhagic infarction in other tissues, such as the lungs, kidneys, central nervous system and adrenal glands, leading to multiple organ failure, and causes initial high mortality and long-term morbidity in survivors. Purpura fulminans may also lead to severe large vessel venous thrombosis if untreated in its early stages.

Purpura fulminans secondary to severe infection is self-limiting. In cases of homozygous protein C deficiency, episodes of purpura fulminans and other thrombotic events are recurrent. Moreover, infant survival due to maintenance replacement therapy is often associated with intellectual disability or visual impairment. For post-infection purpura fulminans, new lesions will occur while neutralising autoantibodies are present (1–2 weeks after presentation).

A multi-disciplinary care team is usually required for rehabilitation after purpura fulminans.

== Epidemiology ==
Purpura fulminans is rare and most commonly occurs in babies and small children but can also be a rare manifestation in adults when it is associated with severe infections. For example, Meningococcal septicaemia is complicated by purpura fulminans in 10–20% of cases among children. Purpura fulminans associated with congenital (inherited) protein C deficiency occurs in 1:500,000–1,000,000 live births.

== Research and case studies ==
Due to the rarity of purpura fulminans and its occurrence in vulnerable patient groups like children research on the condition is very limited and evidence based knowledge is scarce.

Case studies:

Capnocytophaga canimorsus

- 2020: "A case of fulminant sepsis caused by Capnocytophaga canimorsus after a dog bite."
- 2018: "Purpura Fulminans and Septic Shock due to Capnocytophaga Canimorsus after Dog Bite: A Case Report and Review of the Literature."
- 2012: "Two Cases of Infectious Purpura Fulminans and Septic Shock Caused by Capnocytophaga Canimorsus Transmitted from Dogs."
- 1991: "Purpura fulminans and symmetrical peripheral gangrene caused by Capnocytophaga canimorsus (formerly DF-2) septicemia-a complication of dog bite."

Klebsiella oxytoca

- 2018: "Sepsis-associated purpura fulminans due to Klebsiella oxytoca."

Neisseria meningitidis

- 2020: "Fulminant Neisseria meningitidis septicaemia with purpura fulminans requiring limb amputation."

== History ==
Purpura fulminans was first described by Guelliot in 1884.
