= Protein S =

Vitamin K-dependent plasma glycoprotein synthesized in the liver

PROS1
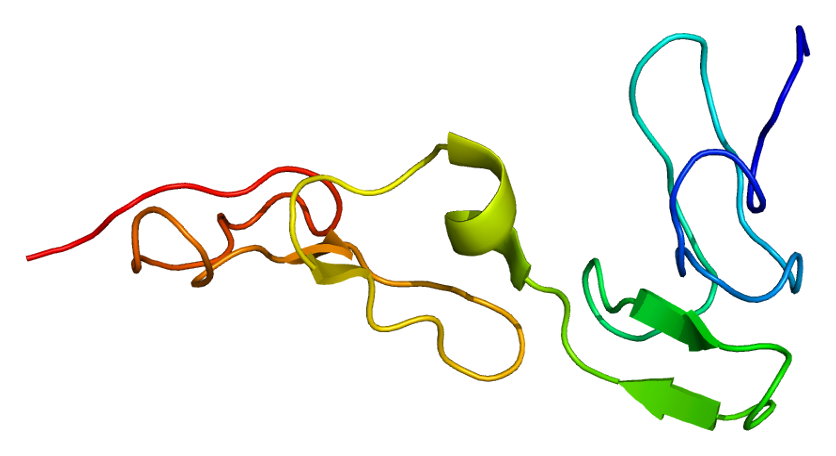

Identifiers
- Aliases: PROS1, PROS, PS21, PS22, PS23, PS24, PS25, PSA, THPH5, THPH6, protein S (alpha), protein S
- External IDs: OMIM: 176880; MGI: 1095733; GeneCards: PROS1
Available structures
PDB	Ortholog search: PDBe RCSB
PDB	List of PDB id codes 1Z6C

Gene location (Human)
Chr.	Chromosome 3 (human)
Band	3q11.1	Start	93,873,051 bp
Band	3q11.1	End	93,980,003 bp

Gene location (Mouse)
Chr.	Chromosome 16 (mouse)
Band	16|16 C1.3	Start	62,674,670 bp
Band	16|16 C1.3	End	62,749,709 bp
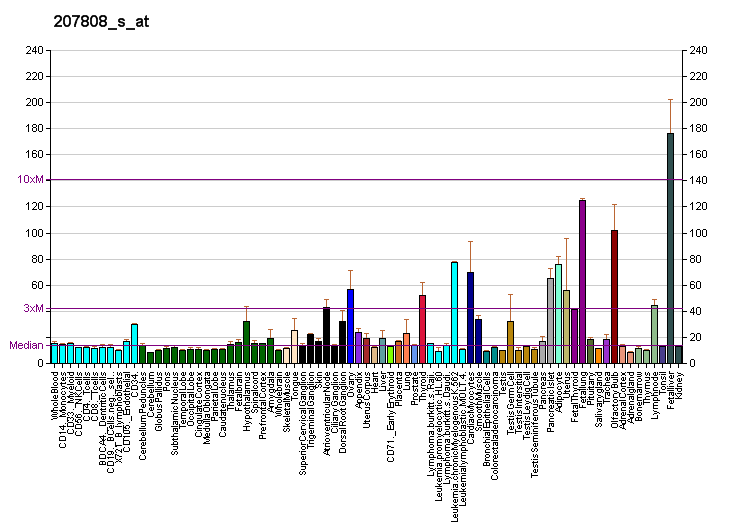
RNA expression pattern
Bgee	Human / Mouse (ortholog); Top expressed in: Epithelium of choroid plexus; bronchial epithelial cell; synovial joint; germinal epithelium; parietal pleura; pericardium; liver; visceral pleura; spinal ganglia; trigeminal ganglion / Top expressed in: cumulus cell; decidua; stroma of bone marrow; aortic valve; endothelial cell of lymphatic vessel; gastrula; iris; calvaria; left lung lobe; sciatic nerve; More reference expression data
BioGPS	More reference expression data
Gene ontology
Molecular function	calcium ion binding; endopeptidase inhibitor activity
Cellular component	blood microparticle; endoplasmic reticulum membrane; Golgi membrane; plasma membrane; extracellular region; Golgi lumen; extracellular exosome; platelet alpha granule lumen; extracellular space
Biological process	hemostasis; fibrinolysis; platelet degranulation; blood coagulation; endoplasmic reticulum to Golgi vesicle-mediated transport; signal peptide processing; peptidyl-glutamic acid carboxylation; regulation of complement activation; leukocyte migration; negative regulation of endopeptidase activity; negative regulation of blood coagulation
Sources:Amigo / QuickGO
Orthologs
Databases	NCBI: entry; OMA: entry
Species	Human	Mouse
Entrez	5627	19128
Ensembl	ENSG00000184500	ENSMUSG00000022912
UniProt	P07225	Q08761
RefSeq (mRNA)	NM_000313; NM_001314077	NM_011173
RefSeq (protein)	NP_000304; NP_001301006	NP_035303
Location (UCSC)	Chr 3: 93.87 – 93.98 Mb	Chr 16: 62.67 – 62.75 Mb
PubMed search
- Wikidata
View/Edit Human	View/Edit Mouse

Protein S (also known as PROS) is a vitamin K-dependent plasma glycoprotein synthesized in the liver. In the circulation, Protein S exists in two forms: a free form and a complex form bound to complement protein C4b-binding protein (C4BP). In humans, protein S is encoded by the PROS1 gene. Protein S plays a role in coagulation.

== History ==
Protein S is named for Seattle, Washington, where it was originally discovered and purified by Earl Davie's group in 1977.

== Structure ==
Protein S is partly homologous to other vitamin K-dependent plasma coagulation proteins, such as protein C and factors VII, IX, and X. Similar to them, it has a Gla domain and several EGF-like domains (four rather than two), but no serine protease domain. Instead, there is a large C-terminus domain that is homologous to plasma steroid hormone-binding proteins such as sex hormone-binding globulin and corticosteroid-binding globulin. It may play a role in the protein functions as either a cofactor for activated protein C (APC) or in binding C4BP.

Additionally, protein S has a peptide between the Gla domain and the EGF-like domain, that is cleaved by thrombin. The Gla and EGF-like domains stay connected after the cleavage by a disulfide bond. However, protein S loses its function as an APC cofactor following either this cleavage or binding C4BP.

== Function ==
The best characterized function of Protein S is its role in the anti coagulation pathway, where it functions as a cofactor to Protein C in the inactivation of Factors Va and VIIIa. Only the free form has cofactor activity.

Protein S binds to negatively charged phospholipids via the carboxylated Gla domain. This property allows Protein S to facilitate the removal of cells that are undergoing apoptosis, a form of structured cell death used by the body to remove unwanted or damaged cells. In healthy cells, an ATP (adenosine triphosphate)-dependent enzyme removes negatively charged phospholipids such as phosphatidyl serine from the outer leaflet of the cell membrane. An apoptotic cell (that is, one undergoing apoptosis) no longer actively manages the distribution of phospholipids in its outer membrane and hence begins to display negatively charged phospholipids on its exterior surface. These negatively charged phospholipids are recognized by phagocytes such as macrophages. Protein S binds to the negatively charged phospholipids and functions as a bridge between the apoptotic cell and the phagocyte. This bridging expedites phagocytosis and allows the cell to be removed without giving rise to inflammation or other signs of tissue damage.

Protein S does not bind to the nascent complement complex C5,6,7 to prevent it from inserting into a membrane. This is a different complement protein S AKA vitronectin made by the VTN gene, not to be confused with the coagulation protein S made by the PROS gene which this wiki page concerns.

== Pathology ==
Mutations in the PROS1 gene can lead to Protein S deficiency which is a rare blood disorder which can lead to an increased risk of thrombosis. The SARS-CoV-2 papain-like protease (PLpro) was shown to cleave a sequence (LRGG*KIEVQL) in PROS1. The cleavage of PROS1 may lead to a transient deficiency in PROS1 during or after infection and may be associated with COVID coagulopathy.

== Interactions ==
Protein S has been shown to interact with Factor V. A sequence in PROS1 can be cut by the papain-like protease of SARS-CoV-2.

== See also ==
- Hemostasis
