= Protein C deficiency =

- Other names: THPH3
- This condition is inherited in an autosomal dominant manner.
- Specialty: Hematology

Protein C deficiency is a rare genetic trait that predisposes to thrombotic disease. It was first described in 1981. The disease belongs to a group of genetic disorders known as thrombophilias. Protein C deficiency is associated with an increased incidence of venous thromboembolism (relative risk 8–10), whereas no association with arterial thrombotic disease has been found.

== Presentation ==
=== Symptoms ===
People with a mild protein C deficiency often do not exhibit any symptoms, even into adulthood. However, they are at higher risk for venous thromboembolism, especially deep vein thrombosis.

Babies with severe protein C deficiency may experience symptoms within hours or days of their birth. Some symptoms include blood clots primarily in the blood vessels of the limbs (purpura fulminans, disseminated intravascular coagulation), abnormal bleeding into affected areas, and large purple patches or spots anywhere on the body.

=== Complications ===
Protein C is vitamin K-dependent. Patients with Protein C deficiency are at an increased risk of developing skin necrosis while on warfarin. Protein C has a short half-life (8 hours) compared with other vitamin K-dependent factors and therefore is rapidly depleted with warfarin initiation, resulting in a transient hypercoagulable state.

== Pathophysiology ==
The main function of protein C is its anticoagulant property as an inhibitor of coagulation factors V and VIII. A deficiency results in a loss of the normal cleaving of Factors Va and VIIIa. There are two main types of protein C mutations that lead to protein C deficiency:

- Type I: Quantitative defects of protein C (low production or short protein half-life)
- Type II: Qualitative defects, in which interaction with other molecules is abnormal. Defects in interaction with thrombomodulin, phospholipids, factors V/VIII and others have been described.

The majority of people with protein C deficiency lack only one copy of the functioning genes, and are therefore heterozygous. Before 1999, only sixteen cases of homozygous protein C deficiency had been described (two abnormal copies of the gene, leading to absence of functioning protein C in the bloodstream). This may manifest itself as purpura fulminans in newborn babies.

== Diagnosis ==
There are two main types of protein C assays, activity and antigen (immunoassays). Commercially available activity assays are based on chromogenic assays that use activation by snake venom in an activating reagent, or clotting and enzyme-linked immunosorbant assays. Repeated testing for protein C functional activity allows differentiation between transient and congenital deficiency of protein C.

Initially, a protein C activity (functional) assay can be performed, and if the result is low, a protein C antigen assay can be considered to determine the deficiency subtype (Type I or Type II). In type I deficiencies, normally functioning protein C molecules are made in reduced quantity. In type II deficiencies normal amounts of dysfunctional protein C are synthesized.

Antigen assays are immunoassays designed to measure the quantity of protein C regardless of its function. Type I deficiencies are therefore characterized by a decrease in both activity and antigen protein C assays whereas type II deficiencies exhibit normal protein C antigen levels with decreased activity levels.

The human protein C gene (PROC) comprises 9 exons, and protein C deficiency has been linked to over 160 mutations to date. Therefore, DNA testing for protein C deficiency is generally not available outside of specialized research laboratories.

Manifestation of purpura fulminans as it is usually associated with reduced protein C plasma concentrations of <5 mg IU/dL. The normal concentration of plasma protein C is 70 nM (4 μg/mL) with a half live of approximately 8 hours. Healthy term neonates, however, have lower (and more variable) physiological levels of protein C (ranging between 15-55 IU/dL) than older children or adults, and these concentrations progressively increase throughout the first 6 months of life. Protein C levels may be <10 IU/dL in preterm or twin neonates or those with respiratory distress without manifesting either purpura fulminans or disseminated intravascular coagulation.

== Treatment ==
Primary prophylaxis with low-molecular weight heparin, heparin, or warfarin is often considered in known familial cases. Anticoagulant prophylaxis is given to all who develop a venous clot regardless of underlying cause. Studies have demonstrated an increased risk of recurrent venous thromboembolic events in patients with protein C deficiency. Therefore, long-term anticoagulation therapy with warfarin may be considered in these patients. Homozygous protein C defect constitutes a potentially life-threatening disease, and warrants the use of supplemental protein C concentrates. Liver transplant may be considered curative for homozygous protein C deficiency.

== Epidemiology ==
Heterozygous protein C deficiency occurs in 0.14–0.50% of the general population. Based on an estimated carrier rate of 0.2%, a homozygous or compound heterozygous protein C deficiency incidence of 1 per 4 million births could be predicted, although far fewer living patients have been identified. This low prevalence of patients with severe genetic protein C deficiency may be explained by excessive fetal demise, early postnatal deaths before diagnosis, heterogeneity in the cause of low concentrations of protein C among healthy individuals and under-reporting.

The incidence of protein C deficiency in individuals who present with clinical symptoms has been reported to be estimated at 1 in 20,000.
