= Drotrecogin alfa =

Pharmaceutical drug

Clinical data
- Trade names: Xigris
- AHFS/Drugs.com: Monograph
- Routes of administration: Intravenous
- ATC code: B01AD10 (WHO)

Legal status
- Legal status: In general: ℞ (Prescription only)

Pharmacokinetic data
- Bioavailability: 100% (i.v. application only)
- Metabolism: endogenous plasma protease inhibitors
- Elimination half-life: less than 2 hours

Identifiers
- IUPAC name: Activated human protein C
- CAS Number: 98530-76-8
- IUPHAR/BPS: 6788
- DrugBank: DB00055
- ChemSpider: none
- UNII: JGH8MYC891

Chemical and physical data
- Formula: C_{1786}H_{2779}N_{509}O_{519}S_{29}
- Molar mass: 40615.66 g·mol^{−1}

Drotrecogin alfa (activated) (Xigris, marketed by Eli Lilly and Company) is a recombinant form of human activated protein C that has anti-thrombotic, anti-inflammatory, and profibrinolytic properties. Drotrecogin alpha (activated) belongs to the class of serine proteases. Drotrecogin alfa has not been found to improve outcomes in people with severe sepsis. The manufacturer's aggressive strategies in marketing its use in severe sepsis have been criticized. On October 25, 2011, Eli Lilly & Co. withdrew Xigris from the market after a major study showed no efficacy for the treatment of sepsis.

== Medical uses ==
Drotrecogin alfa does not improve mortality in severe sepsis or septic shock but does increase bleeding risks. Therefore, a 2012 Cochrane review recommended that clinicians and policymakers not recommend its use and Eli Lilly has announced the discontinuation of all clinical trials.

== Risks and contraindications ==
=== Contraindications ===
The following groups should not receive drotrecogin:

- Patients with active internal bleeding
- Patients with a recent (within 3 months) hemorrhagic stroke
- Patients with a recent (within 2 months) intracranial/intraspinal surgery/severe head trauma
- Trauma patients with an increased risk of life-threatening bleeding
- Patients with an epidural catheter
- Patients with a known or suspected intracranial neoplasm or mass lesion
- Patients with known hypersensitivity to drotrecogin or any component

=== Precautions ===
The following conditions could cause patients to be at an increased risk for bleeding complications due to drotrecogin-alpha therapy, and a careful risk/benefit assessment should be made prior to initiating therapy.

- Therapeutic Heparin (>15 units/kg/h)
- Platelet count <30,000/mm3
- Recent (within 6 weeks) gastrointestinal bleeding
- Recent administration (within 3 days) of thrombolytic therapy
- Recent administration (within 7 days) of oral anticoagulants or GP IIb/IIIa inhibitors
- Recent administration (within 7 days) of >650 mg/day of aspirin or other platelet inhibitors
- Recent (within 3 months) ischemic stroke
- Known or suspected intracranial AV malformation or aneurysm
- Known bleeding diathesis (e.g., hemophilia) except for acute coagulopathy related to sepsis
- Chronic severe hepatic disease
- HIV infection in association with a last known CD4 count of <50/mm3
- Any other condition in which bleeding constitutes a significant hazard or would be particularly difficult to manage because of its location
- Because drotrecogin-alpha is a therapeutic protein, there exists a potential for immunogenicity. Antibodies against drotrecogin have been observed. There is insufficient data at this time to quantify the risk, but extreme caution should be exercised if a patient has previously received drotrecogin-alpha.

=== Side-effects ===
Although patients at high risk of bleeding were excluded from the phase III clinical study (PROWESS), 25% of patients treated with drotrecogin and 18% of those receiving placebo experienced at least one bleeding event (principally ecchymoses or GI bleeding) during the 28-day study period. During treatment, serious bleeding events (e.g., intracranial hemorrhage, any life-threatening bleeding event, any bleeding event requiring administration of at least 3 units of packed red blood cells daily for 2 consecutive days) occurred in 2.4% of patients treated with drotrecogin and in 1% of those receiving placebo. No significant differences between geriatric patients and younger patients regarding bleeding events in the drotrecogin group were found.

No non-bleeding side-effects were observed.

A second study, encompassing approximately 1700 adult patients, was completed in 2011 and showed a comparable side-effect profile.

== Interactions ==
Drug interactions with drotrecogin have not been systematically studied in patients with severe sepsis. Caution should be exercised when using other drugs that affect hemostasis concomitantly with drotrecogin (e.g. aspirin, warfarin, clopidogrel). However, the use of low dose prophylactic Heparin did not affect safety when given concurrently with drotrecogin.

== Pharmacology ==
=== Mechanism of action ===
The specific mechanisms by which drotrecogin exerts its effect on survival in patients with severe sepsis is not completely understood. In vitro data suggest that activated protein C exerts an antithrombotic effect by inhibiting factors Va and VIIIa, and that it has indirect profibrinolytic activity by inhibiting plasminogen activator inhibitor-1 (PAI-1). In vitro data also suggest that activated protein C may exert an anti-inflammatory effect by inhibiting tumor necrosis factor production, by blocking leukocyte adhesion to selectins, and by limiting the thrombin-induced inflammatory responses within the microvascular endothelium.

=== Pharmacokinetics ===
If the dosage guidelines are followed, the drug reaches peak plasma levels after two hours and is completely cleared from plasma two hours after termination of the infusion period. Endogenous plasma protease inhibitors deactivate drotrecogin. Therefore, no dose adjustment is needed in elderly patients, or in patients with renal or hepatic dysfunction.

=== Presentation ===
Xigris is the current brand name of activated drotrecogin alfa, manufactured by Eli Lilly. The drug is sold in vials containing either 5 mg or 20 mg, respectively. The drug was approved by the United States' Food and Drug Administration (FDA) in 2001, and the European Medicines Agency (EMA), the Australian Therapeutic Goods Administration in 2002 and the Health Canada in 2003.

== Society and culture ==
=== Marketing controversy ===
In 2001, Eli Lilly's chairman, president and CEO, Sidney Taurel, told shareholders: "No medicine better symbolizes our mission than Xigris," calling it "one of our industry's genuine breakthroughs."

Xigris was designed to fight sepsis, a condition that kills more than 200,000 Americans annually. It was the only approved drug for sepsis, and it costs $8,000 to treat a single patient. Lilly hoped it would be a blockbuster, with sales of at least a billion dollars a year. But, after five years on the market, sales were only $200 million.

Eli Lilly used the Belsito & Company PR firm in a marketing campaign to promote Xigris. A report accused the company of initiating false reports of a shortage of the drug to boost sales. Belsito and Company spread the word that the drug was being "rationed" and physicians were being 'systematically forced' to decide who would live and who would die. As part of this effort, Lilly provided a group of physicians and bioethicists with a $1.8 million grant to form the Values, Ethics, and Rationing in Critical Care (VERICC) Task Force, purportedly to address ethical issues raised by rationing in the intensive care unit. Finally, the Surviving Sepsis Campaign was established, in theory to raise awareness of severe sepsis and generate momentum toward the development of treatment guidelines.

This marketing campaign was especially troublesome because Xigris has been linked to increased risk of serious bleeding in patients who used it as well as other concerns. "Controversy surrounds both the drug study itself and the FDA approval," wrote NEJM editor-at-large Richard P. Wenzel, MD in 2002. The FDA approved the drug despite the advisory committee's split vote (10 to 10) due to concerns about the validity of the claimed efficacy and safety findings on the basis of a single trial.

Eli Lilly spokeswoman Judy Kay Moore insisted that the company did not mastermind the ethics task force or steer the guideline-writing process. It was only a coincidence, Moore says, that the ethics task force and the Surviving Sepsis Campaign used the same P.R. firm, Belsito and Company.

=== FDA approval and withdrawal ===
In 2002, drotrecogin was FDA approved for use in the US for the reduction of mortality in adult patients with severe sepsis (sepsis associated with acute organ dysfunction) who have a high risk of death (as determined by APACHE II scores of 25 or greater). Evidence, however, was not sufficiently strong for its use to become standard of care.

Because of the risk of severe bleeding, associated with the use of Xigris, the following guidelines have been additionally proposed, but are not FDA requirements:

- Drotrecogin should only be ordered by a critical care specialist with experience weighing the risks and benefits of this medication.
- Drotrecogin should only be administered in a critical care area such as an Intensive Care Unit (ICU), or other unit with very frequent observation and monitoring.

On October 25, 2011, Eli Lilly and Company announced a worldwide voluntary market withdrawal of Xigris [drotrecogin alfa (activated)]. In a 2011 study, Xigris failed to show a survival benefit for patients with severe sepsis and septic shock.

== Research ==
The exact mechanism for this protein is currently not known, but efforts continue to isolate activated protein C mutants that lack anticoagulant properties for potential therapeutic use.
