= Protein C =

Mammalian protein found in Homo sapiens

PROC
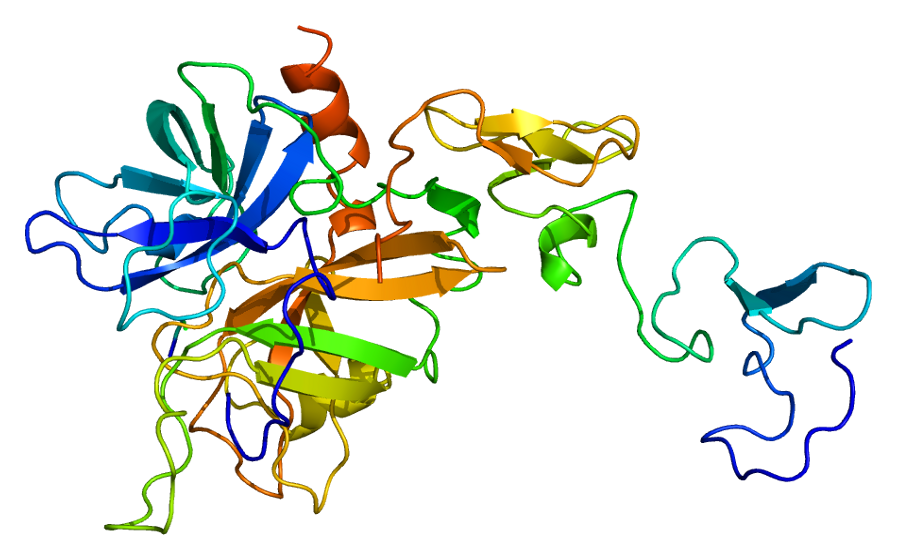

Identifiers
- Aliases: PROC, APC, PC, PROC1, THPH3, THPH4, protein C, inactivator of coagulation factors Va and VIIIa
- External IDs: OMIM: 612283; MGI: 97771; GeneCards: PROC
Available structures
PDB	Ortholog search: PDBe RCSB
PDB	List of PDB id codes 1AUT, 1LQV, 3F6U, 3JTC, 4DT7
Enzyme activity
EC #	BRENDA	ExPASy	KEGG	MetaCyc
3.4.21.69	↗	↗	↗	↗

Gene location (Human)
Chr.	Chromosome 2 (human)
Band	2q14.3	Start	127,418,427 bp
Band	2q14.3	End	127,429,246 bp

Gene location (Mouse)
Chr.	Chromosome 18 (mouse)
Band	18|18 B1	Start	32,256,179 bp
Band	18|18 B1	End	32,272,623 bp
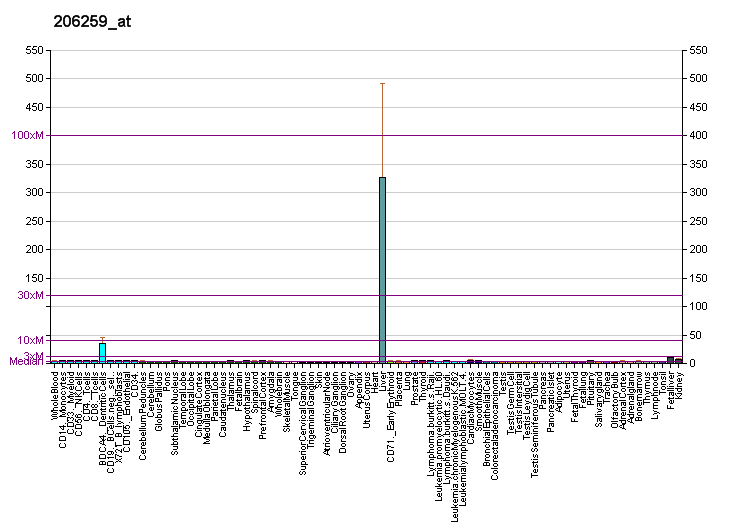
RNA expression pattern
Bgee	Human / Mouse (ortholog); Top expressed in: right lobe of liver; kidney tubule; human kidney; mucosa of transverse colon; glomerulus; metanephric glomerulus; body of stomach; granulocyte; olfactory zone of nasal mucosa; fundus / Top expressed in: left lobe of liver; right kidney; human kidney; proximal tubule; gallbladder; fetal liver hematopoietic progenitor cell; primary oocyte; yolk sac; Paneth cell; seminiferous tubule; More reference expression data
BioGPS	More reference expression data
Gene ontology
Molecular function	calcium ion binding; peptidase activity; protein binding; serine-type peptidase activity; serine-type endopeptidase activity; hydrolase activity
Cellular component	Golgi apparatus; endoplasmic reticulum lumen; extracellular region; endoplasmic reticulum; Golgi lumen; extracellular space
Biological process	hemostasis; negative regulation of coagulation; negative regulation of blood coagulation; blood coagulation; negative regulation of apoptotic process; positive regulation of establishment of endothelial barrier; proteolysis; endoplasmic reticulum to Golgi vesicle-mediated transport; negative regulation of inflammatory response; liver development; regulation of circulating fibrinogen levels; post-translational protein modification
Sources:Amigo / QuickGO
Orthologs
Databases	NCBI: entry; OMA: entry
Species	Human	Mouse
Entrez	5624	19123
Ensembl	ENSG00000115718	ENSMUSG00000024386
UniProt	P04070	P33587
RefSeq (mRNA)	NM_000312	NM_001042767; NM_001042768; NM_008934; NM_001313938
RefSeq (protein)	NP_000303; NP_001362531; NP_001362532; NP_001362533; NP_001362534 NP_001362535; NP_001362536; NP_001362537; NP_001362538; NP_001362539; NP_001362540; NP_001362542	NP_001036232; NP_001036233; NP_001300867; NP_032960
Location (UCSC)	Chr 2: 127.42 – 127.43 Mb	Chr 18: 32.26 – 32.27 Mb
PubMed search
- Wikidata
View/Edit Human	View/Edit Mouse

Protein C, also known as autoprothrombin IIA and blood coagulation factor XIV, is a vitamin K-dependent glycoprotein that circulates in blood plasma as a zymogen (an inactive enzyme precursor). In humans, it is encoded by the PROC gene on chromosome 2. Thrombin, in complex with thrombomodulin, converts protein C to activated protein C (APC), a serine protease.

APC limits blood clotting by cleaving and inactivating factor V_{a} and factor VIII_{a}. When bound to the endothelial protein C receptor (EPCR), APC also signals through protease-activated receptor 1 (PAR-1), helping to limit inflammation and apoptosis and maintain the endothelial barrier. Both protein C deficiency and resistance to APC increase the risk of venous thrombosis.

== Gene ==
The biologic instructions for synthesising protein C in humans are encoded in the gene officially named "protein C (inactivator of coagulation factors Va and VIIIa)". The gene's symbol approved by the HUGO Gene Nomenclature Committee is "PROC" from "protein C". It is located on the second chromosome (2q13-q14) and comprises nine exons. The nucleotide sequence that codes for human protein C is approximately 11,000 bases long.

== Structure and processing ==
Human protein C is a vitamin K-dependent glycoprotein structurally similar to other vitamin K-dependent proteins affecting blood clotting, such as prothrombin, Factor VII, Factor IX and Factor X. Protein C synthesis occurs in the liver and begins with a single-chain precursor molecule: a 32 amino acid N-terminus signal peptide preceding a propeptide. Protein C is formed when a dipeptide of Lys^{198} and Arg^{199} is removed; this causes the transformation into a heterodimer with N-linked carbohydrates on each chain. The protein has one light chain (21 kDa) and one heavy chain (41 kDa) connected by a disulfide bond between Cys^{183} and Cys^{319}.

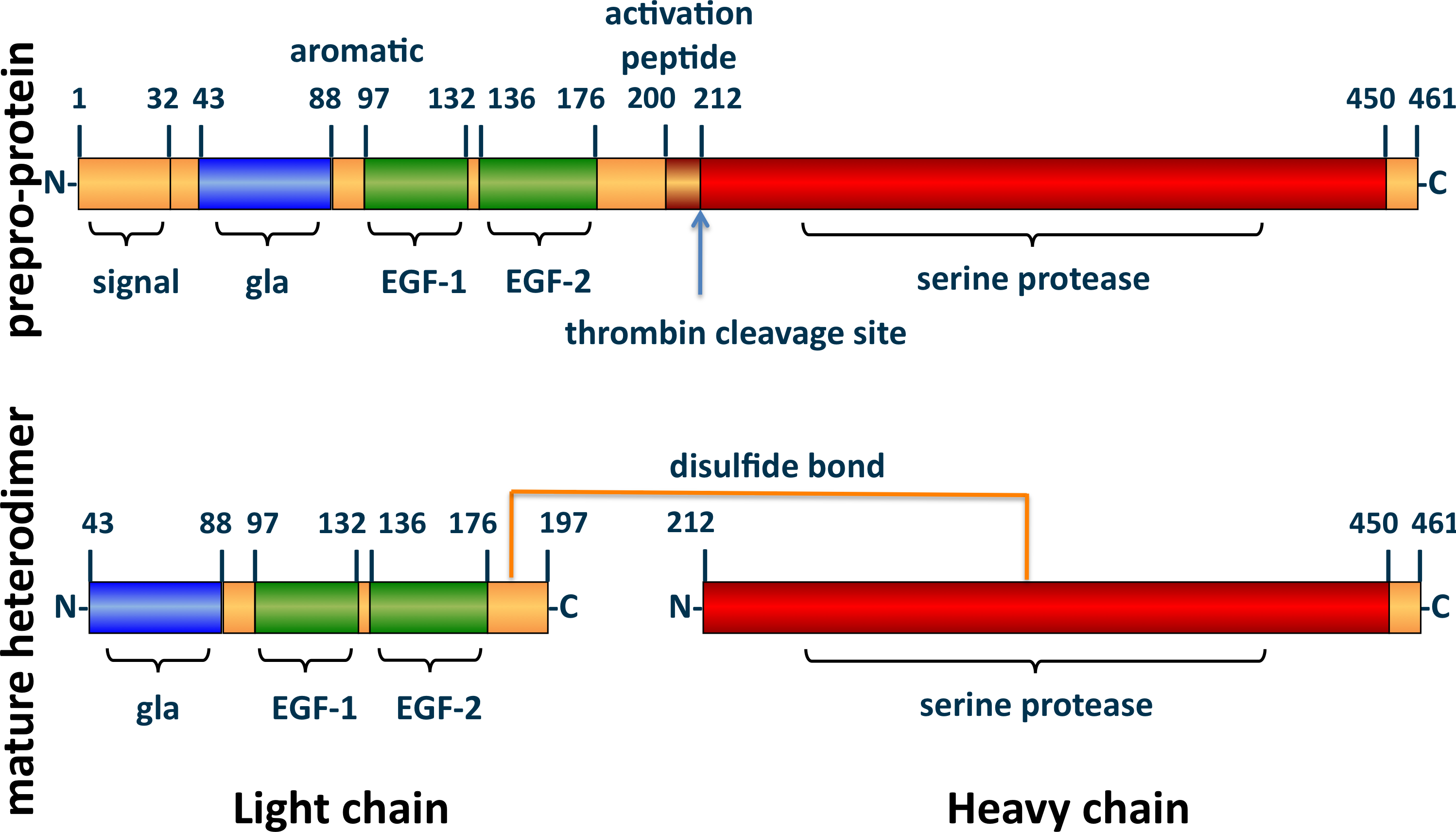
Domain structure of preproprotein C (top) and the mature heterodimer (bottom).

Inactive protein C comprises 419 amino acids in multiple domains: one Gla domain (residues 43–88); a helical aromatic segment (89–96); two epidermal growth factor (EGF)-like domains (97–132 and 136–176); an activation peptide (200–211); and a trypsin-like serine protease domain (212–450). The light chain contains the Gla- and EGF-like domains and the aromatic segment. The heavy chain contains the protease domain and the activation peptide. It is in this form that 85–90% of protein C circulates in the plasma as a zymogen, waiting to be activated. The remaining protein C zymogen comprises slightly modified forms of the protein. Activation of the enzyme occurs when a thrombin molecule cleaves away the activation peptide from the N-terminus of the heavy chain. The active site contains a catalytic triad typical of serine proteases (His^{253}, Asp^{299} and Ser^{402}).

The Gla domain is particularly useful for binding to negatively charged phospholipids for anticoagulation and to EPCR for cytoprotection. One particular exosite augments protein C's ability to inactivate Factor V_{a} efficiently. Another is necessary for interacting with thrombomodulin.

=== Post-translational modifications ===
Human protein C has at least five types of post-translational modifications: (1) gamma-carboxylation on the first nine glutamic acid residues in the protein sequence. This modification event is performed by a vitamin K-dependent microsomal carboxylase. The full complement of Gla is required to give full activity to protein C. (2) beta-Hydroxylation of Asp71 in one of the two EGF-like domains to give erythro-L-beta-hydroxy-aspartate (bHA). The modification is required for functional activity as was demonstrated by mutating Asp71 to Glu. (3) N-linked glycosylation at three possible glycosylation sites. Plasma human Protein C has been reported to be 23% carbohydrate by weight. (4) Disulfide formation. (5) Multiple proteolytic cleavages of the polypeptide backbone to remove an 18 amino acid signal peptide, a 24 amino acid propeptide and then cleavages at amino acids 155-156 and 157-158 to yield the two-chain structure of the circulating zymogen.

== Function ==
The activation of protein C is strongly promoted by thrombomodulin and endothelial protein C receptor (EPCR), the latter of which is found primarily on endothelial cells (cells on the inside of blood vessels). The presence of thrombomodulin accelerates activation by several orders of magnitude, and EPCR speeds up activation by a factor of 20. If either of these two proteins is absent in murine specimens, the mouse dies from excessive blood-clotting while still in an embryonic state. On the endothelium, APC performs a major role in regulating blood clotting, inflammation, and cell death (apoptosis). Because of the accelerating effect of thrombomodulin on the activation of protein C, the protein may be said to be activated not by thrombin but the thrombin–thrombomodulin (or even thrombin–thrombomodulin–EPCR) complex. Once in active form, APC may or may not remain bound to EPCR, to which it has approximately the same affinity as the protein zymogen.

Protein C in zymogen form is present in normal adult human blood plasma at concentrations between 65 and 135 IU/dL. Activated protein C is found at levels approximately 2000 times lower than this. Mild protein C deficiency corresponds to plasma levels above 20 IU/dL, but below the normal range. Moderately severe deficiencies describe blood concentrations between 1 and 20 IU/dL; severe deficiencies yield levels of protein C that are below 1 IU/dL or are undetectable. Protein C levels in a healthy term infant average 40 IU/dL. The concentration of protein C increases until six months, when the mean level is 60 IU/dL; the level stays low through childhood until it reaches adult levels after adolescence. The half-life of activated protein C is around 15 minutes.

The protein C pathways are the specific chemical reactions that control the level of expression of APC and its activity in the body. Protein C is pleiotropic, with two main classes of functions: anticoagulation and cytoprotection (its direct effect on cells). Which function protein C performs depends on whether or not APC remains bound to EPCR after it is activated; the anticoagulative effects of APC occur when it does not. In this case, protein C functions as an anticoagulant by irreversibly proteolytically inactivating Factor V_{a} and Factor VIII_{a}, turning them into Factor V_{i} and Factor VIII_{i} respectively. When still bound to EPCR, activated protein C performs its cytoprotective effects, acting on the effector substrate PAR-1, protease-activated receptor-1. To a degree, APC's anticoagulant properties are independent of its cytoprotective ones, in that expression of one pathway is not affected by the existence of the other.

The activity of protein C may be down-regulated by reducing the amount either of available thrombomodulin or of EPCR. This may be done by inflammatory cytokines, such as interleukin-1β (IL-1β ) and tumor necrosis factor-α (TNF-α). Activated leukocytes release these inflammatory mediators during inflammation, inhibiting the creation of both thrombomodulin and EPCR, and inducing their shedding from the endothelial surface. Both of these actions down-regulate protein C activation. Thrombin itself may also have an effect on the levels of EPCR. In addition, proteins released from cells can impede protein C activation, for example eosinophil, which may explain thrombosis in hypereosinophilic heart disease. Protein C may be up-regulated by platelet factor 4. This cytokine is conjectured to improve activation of protein C by forming an electrostatic bridge from protein C's Gla domain to the glycosaminoglycan (GAG) domain of thrombomodulin, reducing the Michaelis constant (K_{M}) for their reaction. In addition, Protein C is inhibited by protein C inhibitor.

=== Anticoagulative effects ===
Blood coagulation and the protein C anticoagulation pathway

Protein C is a major component in anticoagulation in the human body. It acts as a serine protease zymogen: APC proteolyses peptide bonds in activated Factor V and Factor VIII (Factor V_{a} and Factor VIII_{a}), and one of the amino acids in the bond is serine. These proteins that APC inactivates, Factor V_{a} and Factor VIII_{a}, are highly procoagulant cofactors in the generation of thrombin, which is a crucial element in blood clotting; together they are part of the prothrombinase complex. Cofactors in the inactivation of Factor V_{a} and Factor VIII_{a} include protein S, Factor V, high-density lipoprotein, anionic phospholipids and glycosphingolipids.

Factor V_{a} binds to prothrombin and Factor X_{a}, increasing the rate at which thrombin is produced by four orders of magnitude (10,000x). Inactivation of Factor V_{a} thus practically halts the production of thrombin. Factor VIII, on the other hand, is a cofactor in production of activated Factor X, which in turn converts prothrombin into thrombin. Factor VIII_{a} augments Factor X activation by a factor of around 200,000. Because of its importance in clotting, Factor VIII is also known as anti-haemophilic factor, and deficiencies of Factor VIII cause haemophilia A.

APC inactivates Factor V_{a} by making three cleavages (Arg^{306}, Arg^{506}, Arg^{679}). The cleavages at both Arg^{306} and Arg^{506} diminish the molecule's attraction to Factor X_{a}, and though the first of these sites is slow to be cleaved, it is entirely necessary to the functioning of Factor V. Protein S aids this process by catalysing the proteolysis at Arg^{306}, in which the A2 domain of Factor V is dissociated from the rest of the protein. Protein S also binds to Factor X_{a}, inhibiting the latter from diminishing APC's inactivation of Factor V_{a}.

The inactivation of Factor VIII_{a} is not as well understood. The half-life of Factor VIII_{a} is only around two minutes unless Factor IX_{a} is present to stabilise it. Some have questioned the significance of APC's inactivation of Factor VIII_{a}, and it is unknown to what degree Factor V and protein S are cofactors in its proteolysis. It is known that APC works on Factor VIII_{a} by cleaving at two sites, Arg^{336} and Arg^{562}, either of which is sufficient to disable Factor VIII_{a} and convert it to Factor VIII_{i}.

=== Cytoprotective effects ===
When APC is bound to EPCR, it performs a number of important cytoprotective (i.e. cell-protecting) functions, most of which are known to require EPCR and PAR-1. These include regulating gene expression, anti-inflammatory effects, antiapoptotic effects and protecting endothelial barrier function.

Treatment of cells with APC demonstrates that its gene expression modulation effectively controls major pathways for inflammatory and apoptotic behaviour. There are about 20 genes that are up-regulated by protein C, and 20 genes that are down-regulated: the former are generally anti-inflammatory and antiapoptotic pathways, while the latter tend to be proinflammatory and proapoptotic. APC's mechanisms for altering gene expression profiles are not well understood, but it is believed that they at least partly involve an inhibitory effect on transcription factor activity. Important proteins that APC up-regulates include Bcl-2, eNOS and IAP. APC effects significant down-regulation of p53 and Bax.

APC has anti-inflammatory effects on endothelial cells and leukocytes. APC affects endothelial cells by inhibiting inflammatory mediator release and down-regulating vascular adhesion molecules. This reduces leukocyte adhesion and infiltration into tissues, while also limiting damage to underlying tissue. APC supports endothelial barrier function and reduces chemotaxis. APC inhibits the release of inflammatory-response mediators in leukocytes as well as endothelial cells, by reducing cytokine response, and maybe diminishing systemic inflammatory response, such as is seen in sepsis. Studies on both rats and humans have demonstrated that APC reduces endotoxin-induced pulmonary injury and inflammation.

Scientists recognise activated protein C's antiapoptotic effects, but are unclear as to the exact mechanisms by which apoptosis is inhibited. It is known that APC is neuroprotective. Antiapoptosis is achieved with diminished activation of caspase 3 and caspase 8, improved Bax/Bcl-2 ratio and down-regulation of p53.

Activated protein C also provides much protection of endothelial barrier function. Endothelial barrier breakdown, and the corresponding increase in endothelial permeability, are associated with swelling, hypotension and inflammation, all problems of sepsis. APC protects endothelial barrier function by inducing PAR-1 dependent sphingosine kinase-1 activation and up-regulating sphingosine-1-phosphate with sphingosine kinase.

Several studies have indicated that the proteolytic activity of APC contributes to the observed cytoprotective properties of APC, but variants that are proteolytically inactive also are able to regulate formation of PAR-activators thrombin and factor Xa and express cytoprotective properties in vitro and in vivo.

== Clinical significance ==
=== Role in disease ===
A genetic protein C deficiency, in its mild form associated with simple heterozygosity, causes a significantly increased risk of venous thrombosis in adults. If a fetus is homozygous or compound heterozygous for the deficiency, there may be a presentation of purpura fulminans, severe disseminated intravascular coagulation and simultaneous venous thromboembolism in the womb; this is very severe and usually fatal. Deletion of the protein C gene in mice causes fetal death around the time of birth. Fetal mice with no protein C develop normally at first, but experience severe bleeding, coagulopathy, deposition of fibrin and necrosis of the liver.

The frequency of protein C deficiency among asymptomatic individuals is between 1 in 200 and 1 in 500. In contrast, significant symptoms of the deficiency are detectable in 1 in 20,000 individuals. No racial nor ethnic biases have been detected.

At least 177 disease-causing mutations in this gene have been discovered. Activated protein C resistance occurs when APC is unable to perform its functions. This disease has similar symptoms to protein C deficiency. The most common mutation leading to activated protein C resistance among Caucasians is at the cleavage site in Factor V for APC. There, Arg^{506} is replaced with Gln, producing Factor V Leiden. This mutation is also called a R506Q. The mutation leading to the loss of this cleavage site actually stops APC from effectively inactivating both Factor V_{a} and Factor VIII_{a}. Thus, the person's blood clots too readily, and he is perpetually at an increased risk for thrombosis. Individuals heterozygous for the Factor V_{Leiden} mutation carry a risk of venous thrombosis 5–7 times higher than in the general population. Homozygous subjects have a risk 80 times higher. This mutation is also the most common hereditary risk for venous thrombosis among Caucasians.

Around 5% of APC resistance are not associated with the above mutation and Factor V_{Leiden}. Other genetic mutations cause APC resistance, but none to the extent that Factor V_{Leiden} does. These mutations include various other versions of Factor V, spontaneous generation of autoantibodies targeting Factor V, and dysfunction of any of APC's cofactors. Also, some acquired conditions may reduce the efficacy of APC in performing its anticoagulative functions. Studies suggest that between 20% and 60% of thrombophilic patients suffer from some form of APC resistance.

Warfarin necrosis is an acquired protein C deficiency due to treatment with warfarin, which is a vitamin K antagonist and an anticoagulant itself. However, warfarin treatment may produce paradoxical skin lesions similar to those seen in purpura fulminans. A variant of this response presents as venous limb gangrene when warfarin is used to treat deep vein thrombosis associated with cancer. In these situations, warfarin may be restarted at a low dosage to ensure that the protein C deficiency does not present before the vitamin K coagulation factors II, IX and X are suppressed.

Activated protein C cleaves Plasmodium falciparum histones which are released during infection: cleavage of these histones eliminates their pro inflammatory effects.

=== Role in medicine ===
Drotrecogin alfa (activated) is a recombinant form of human activated protein C (APC) formerly marketed by Eli Lilly and Company as Xigris. In November 2001, the US Food and Drug Administration approved it for adults with severe sepsis who were at high risk of death. A 2006 commentary in The New England Journal of Medicine raised concerns about the company's promotion of Xigris and sponsorship of the Surviving Sepsis Campaign.

Eli Lilly withdrew Xigris worldwide in October 2011 after the confirmatory PROWESS-SHOCK trial failed to show a statistically significant reduction in 28-day mortality compared with placebo in adults with septic shock. Across trials in severe sepsis or septic shock, a 2012 Cochrane review found no overall mortality benefit and an increased risk of serious bleeding.

APC has been investigated as a treatment for lung injury because lower APC levels in the lungs were associated with poorer outcomes. It has also been proposed as an adjunct to tissue plasminogen activator (tPA) in ischemic stroke to limit brain injury associated with ischemia and tPA treatment. Another proposed use is to improve outcomes of pancreatic islet transplantation for type 1 diabetes.

Ceprotin was authorised in the European Union in July 2001. Its indications include the treatment of purpura fulminans and coumarin-induced skin necrosis in people with severe congenital protein C deficiency.

== History ==
Protein C's anticoagulant role in the human body was first noted by Seegers et al. in 1960, who gave protein C its original name, autoprothrombin II-a. Protein C was first isolated by Johan Stenflo from bovine plasma in 1976, and Stenflo determined it to be a vitamin K-dependent protein. He named it protein C because it was the third protein ("peak C") that eluted from a DEAE-Sepharose ion-exchange chromotograph. Seegers was, at the time, searching for vitamin K-dependent coagulation factors undetected by clotting assays, which measure global clotting function. Soon after this, Seegers recognised Stenflo's discovery was identical with his own. Activated protein C was discovered later that year, and in 1977 it was first recognised that APC inactivates Factor V_{a}. In 1980, Vehar and Davie discovered that APC also inactivates Factor VIII_{a}, and soon after, Protein S was recognised as a cofactor by Walker. In 1982, a family study by Griffin et al. first associated protein C deficiency with symptoms of venous thrombosis. Homozygous protein C deficiency and the consequent serious health effects were described in 1984 by several scientists. cDNA cloning of protein C was first performed in 1984 by Beckmann et al. which produced a map of the gene responsible for producing protein C in the liver. In 1987 a seminal experiment was performed (Taylor et al.) whereby it was demonstrated that activated protein C prevented coagulopathy and death in baboons infused with lethal concentrations of E. coli.

In 1993, a heritable resistance to APC was detected by Dahlbäck et al. and associated with familial thrombophilia. In 1994, the relatively common genetic mutation that produces Factor V_{Leiden} was noted (Bertina et al.). Two years later, Gla-domainless APC was imaged at a resolution of 2.8 Ångströms. Beginning with the PROWESS clinical trial of 2001, it was recognised that many of the symptoms of sepsis may be ameliorated by infusion of APC, and mortality rates of septic patients may be significantly decreased. Near the end of that year, Drotrecogin alfa (activated), a recombinant human activated protein C, became the first drug approved by the U.S. FDA for treating severe sepsis. In 2002, Science published an article that first showed protein C activates protease-activated receptor-1 (PAR-1) and this process accounts for the protein's modulation of the immune system.

== See also ==
- Activated protein C–protein C inhibitor

== Notes ==
- α: GLA-domainless protein C is produced by selective proteolysis between residues 82 and 83 to remove the N-terminal portion of the protein that includes essentially all of the GLA domain (residues 47–88). The N-terminus was removed in order to make crystallization of the protein easier.
- β: In hypereosinophilia, excess eosinophil-specific granule proteins (such as major basic protein, erythropoietin and eosinophil cationic protein) on the endothelial surface bind to thrombomodulin and inhibit its participation in the activation of protein C by electrostatic interaction on the surface of thrombomodulin.
