= Adson =

Adson is a surname and a given name. Notable people with these names include:

== Surname ==
- Alfred Washington Adson (1887–1951), American doctor (Adson's sign is named after him)
- Artur Adson (1889–1977), Estonian poet, writer and theatre critic
- John Adson (c. 1587–1640), English musician and composer

== Given name ==
- Adson Alves da Silva (born 1982), known as Tinho, Brazilian football striker
- Adson (footballer, born 2000), Adson Ferreira Soares, Brazilian football attacking midfielder for Vasco da Gama
- Adson (footballer, born 2001), Adsonnaldo Ferreira Nascimento, Brazilian football winger for Fluminense-PI
