= Tinho =

Tinho may refer to:

- Tinho (footballer, born 1982), born Adson Alves da Silva, Brazilian football striker
- Tinho (footballer, born 1992), born Adérito Pires da Mata, Santomean football midfielder
