= Wright's test =

- Differential diagnosis: thoracic outlet syndrome

Wright's test is a clinical sign in which the radial pulse weakens or disappears when the arm is abducted and externally rotated. It occurs in some patients with thoracic outlet syndrome.

== See also ==
- Adson's sign
