= Deep vein thrombosis =

Formation of a blood clot in a deep vein

- Other names: Deep venous thrombosis
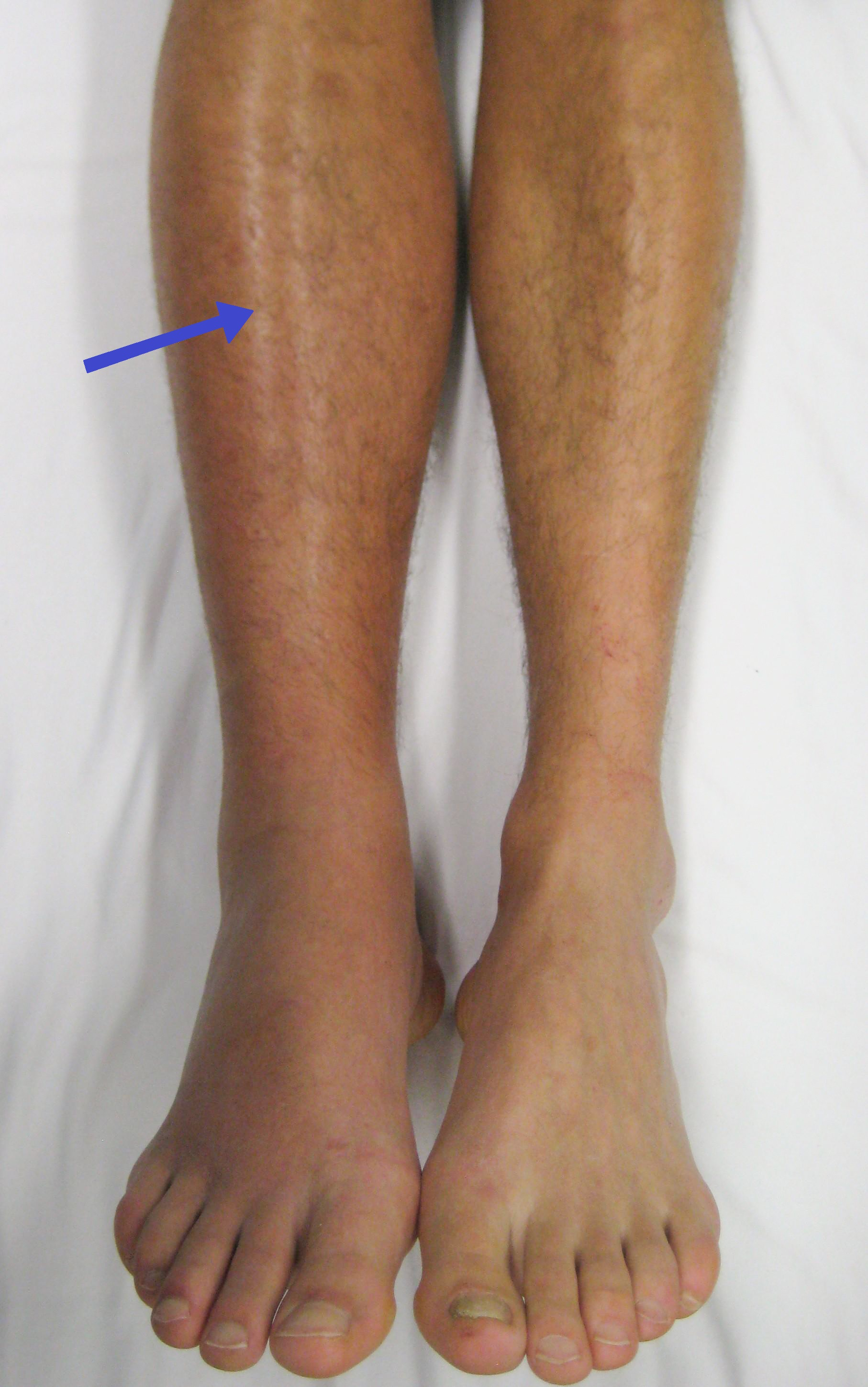
- DVT in the right leg with swelling and redness
- Specialty: Vascular surgery, interventional radiology, hematology, emergency medicine
- Symptoms: Pain, swelling, redness, enlarged veins in the affected limb
- Complications: Post-thrombotic syndrome, recurrent VTE, pulmonary embolism
- Risk factors: Recent surgery, older age, active cancer, obesity, infection, smoking, inflammatory diseases, antiphospholipid syndrome, personal history or family history of VTE, injuries, trauma, lack of movement, hormonal birth control, pregnancy and the period following delivery, genetic factors
- Diagnostic method: Ultrasound, CT venography
- Differential diagnosis: Cellulitis, ruptured Baker's cyst, hematoma, lymphedema, chronic venous insufficiency, etc.
- Prevention: Frequent walking, calf exercises, quitting smoking, maintaining a healthy body weight, anticoagulants (blood thinners), intermittent pneumatic compression, graduated compression stockings, aspirin
- Treatment: Anticoagulation, catheter-directed thrombolysis, mechanical thrombectomy
- Medication: Direct oral anticoagulants, low-molecular-weight heparin, fondaparinux, unfractionated heparin, warfarin
- Frequency: From 0.8–2.7 per 1000 people per year, but populations in China and Korea are below this range

Deep vein thrombosis (DVT) is a type of venous thrombosis involving the formation of a blood clot in a deep vein, most commonly in the legs or pelvis. (Note: Venous thrombosis associated with drainage from the brain (cerebral venous sinus thrombosis), eyes (retinal vein thrombosis), spleen and intestines (splanchnic vein thrombosis), liver (Budd–Chiari syndrome), kidneys (renal vein thrombosis), and ovaries (ovarian vein thrombosis) are more unusual forms of venous thrombosis and they are considered as separate diseases.) Symptoms can include pain, swelling, redness, and enlarged veins in the affected area, but some DVTs have no symptoms.

The most common life-threatening concern with DVT is the potential for a clot to embolize (detach from the veins), travel as an embolus through the right side of the heart, and become lodged in a pulmonary artery that supplies blood to the lungs. This is called a pulmonary embolism (PE). DVT and PE comprise the cardiovascular disease of venous thromboembolism (VTE).

About two-thirds of VTE manifests as DVT only, with one-third manifesting as PE with or without DVT. The most frequent long-term DVT complication is post-thrombotic syndrome, which can cause pain, swelling, a sensation of heaviness, itching, and in severe cases, ulcers. Recurrent VTE occurs in about 30% of those in the ten years following an initial VTE.

The mechanism behind DVT formation typically involves some combination of decreased blood flow, increased tendency to clot, changes to the blood vessel wall, and inflammation. Risk factors include recent surgery, older age, active cancer, obesity, infection, inflammatory diseases, antiphospholipid syndrome, personal history and family history of VTE, trauma, injuries, lack of movement, hormonal birth control, pregnancy, and the period following birth. VTE has a strong genetic component, accounting for approximately 50-60% of the variability in VTE rates. Genetic factors include non-O blood type, deficiencies of antithrombin, protein C, and protein S and the mutations of factor V Leiden and prothrombin G20210A, among dozens identified.

People suspected of having DVT can be assessed using a prediction rule such as the Wells score. A D-dimer test can also be used to assist with excluding the diagnosis or signal a need for further testing. Diagnosis is most commonly confirmed by ultrasound of the suspected veins. VTE becomes much more common with age. The condition is rare in children, but occurs in almost 1% of those ≥ aged 85 annually. Asian, Asian-American, Native American, and Hispanic individuals have a lower VTE risk than white or Black people. It is more common in men than in women. Populations in Asia have VTE rates of 15 to 20% of what is seen in Western countries.

Using blood thinners is the standard treatment. Typical medications include rivaroxaban, apixaban, and warfarin. Beginning warfarin treatment requires an additional non-oral anticoagulant, often injections of heparin.

Prevention of VTE in the general population includes avoiding obesity and maintaining an active lifestyle. Preventive efforts following low-risk surgery include early and frequent walking. Riskier surgeries generally prevent VTE with a blood thinner or aspirin combined with intermittent pneumatic compression.

== Signs and symptoms ==
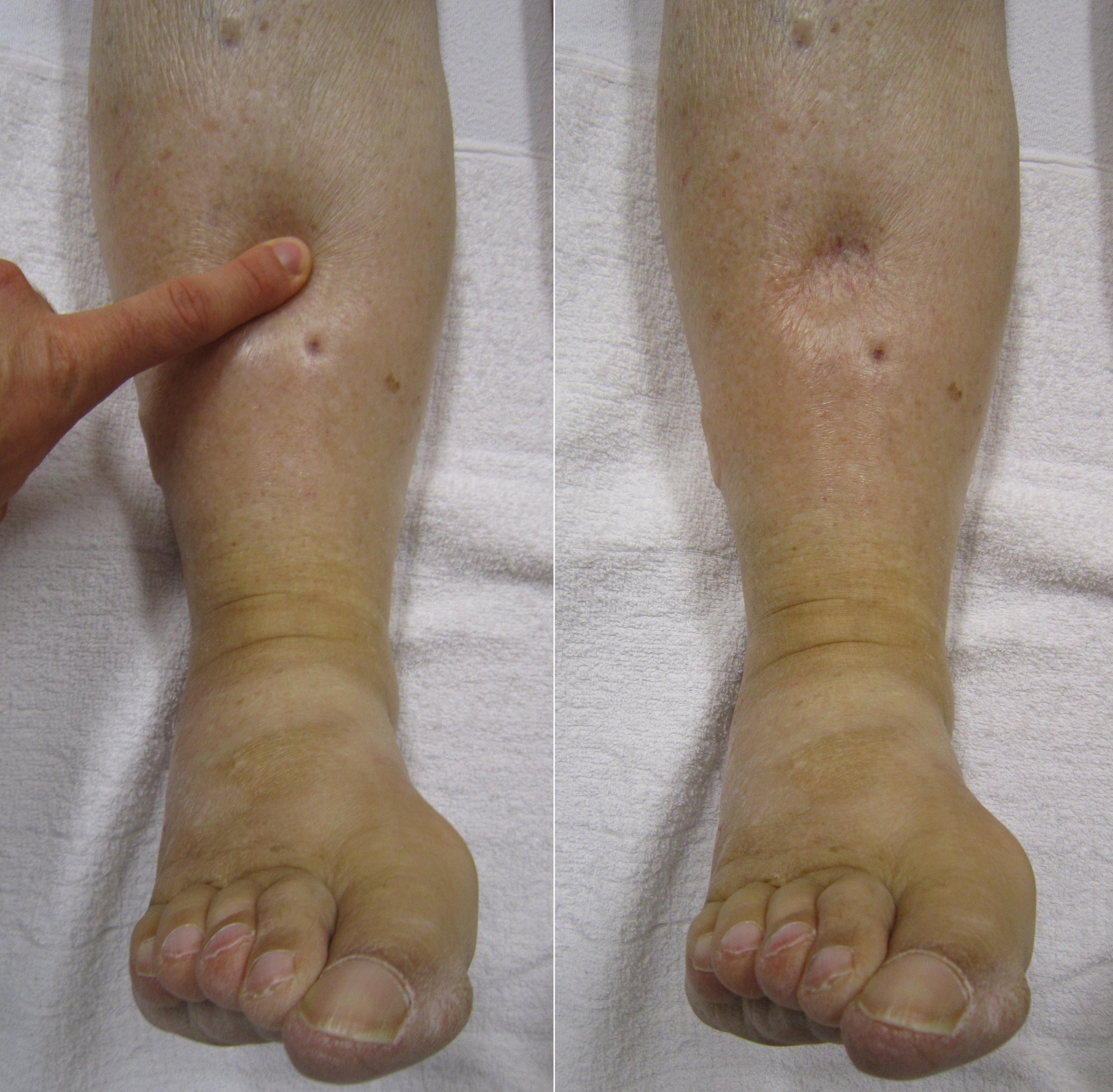
Swelling from fluid (edema) can result in "pitting" after pressure is applied. If this occurs only on one side, it raises the likelihood of DVT.

Symptoms classically affect a leg and typically develop over hours or days, though they can develop suddenly or over a matter of weeks. The legs are primarily affected, with 4–10% of DVT occurring in the arms. Despite the signs and symptoms being highly variable, the typical symptoms are pain, swelling, and redness. However, these symptoms might not manifest in the lower limbs of those unable to walk. In those who are able to walk, DVT can reduce one's ability to do so. The pain can be described as throbbing and can worsen with weight-bearing, prompting one to bear more weight with the unaffected leg.

Additional signs and symptoms include tenderness, pitting edema (see image), dilation of surface veins, warmth, discoloration, a "pulling sensation", and even cyanosis (a blue or purplish discoloration) with fever. DVT can also exist without causing any symptoms. Signs and symptoms help in determining the likelihood of DVT, but they are not used alone for diagnosis.

At times, DVT can cause symptoms in both arms or both legs, as with bilateral DVT. Rarely, a clot in the inferior vena cava can cause both legs to swell. Superficial vein thrombosis, also known as superficial thrombophlebitis, is the formation of a blood clot (thrombus) in a vein close to the skin. It can co-occur with DVT and can be felt as a "palpable cord". Migratory thrombophlebitis (Trousseau's syndrome) is a noted finding in those with pancreatic cancer and is associated with DVT.

=== Potential complications ===
A pulmonary embolism (PE) occurs when a blood clot from a deep vein (a DVT) detaches from a vein (embolizes), travels through the right side of the heart, and becomes lodged as an embolus in a pulmonary artery that supplies deoxygenated blood to the lungs for oxygenation. Up to one-fourth of PE cases are thought to result in sudden death. When not fatal, PE can cause symptoms such as sudden onset shortness of breath or chest pain, coughing up blood (hemoptysis), and fainting (syncope). The chest pain can be pleuritic (worsened by deep breaths) and can vary based upon where the embolus is lodged in the lungs. An estimated 30–50% of those with PE have detectable DVT by compression ultrasound.

A rare and massive DVT that causes significant obstruction and discoloration (including cyanosis) is phlegmasia cerulea dolens. It is life-threatening, limb-threatening, and carries a risk of venous gangrene. Phlegmasia cerulea dolens can occur in the arm but more commonly affects the leg. If found in the setting of acute compartment syndrome, an urgent fasciotomy is warranted to protect the limb. Superior vena cava syndrome is a rare complication of arm DVT.

DVT is thought to be able to cause a stroke in the presence of a heart defect. This is called a paradoxical embolism because the clot abnormally travels from the pulmonary circuit to the systemic circuit while inside the heart. The defect of a patent foramen ovale is thought to allow clots to travel through the interatrial septum from the right atrium into the left atrium.

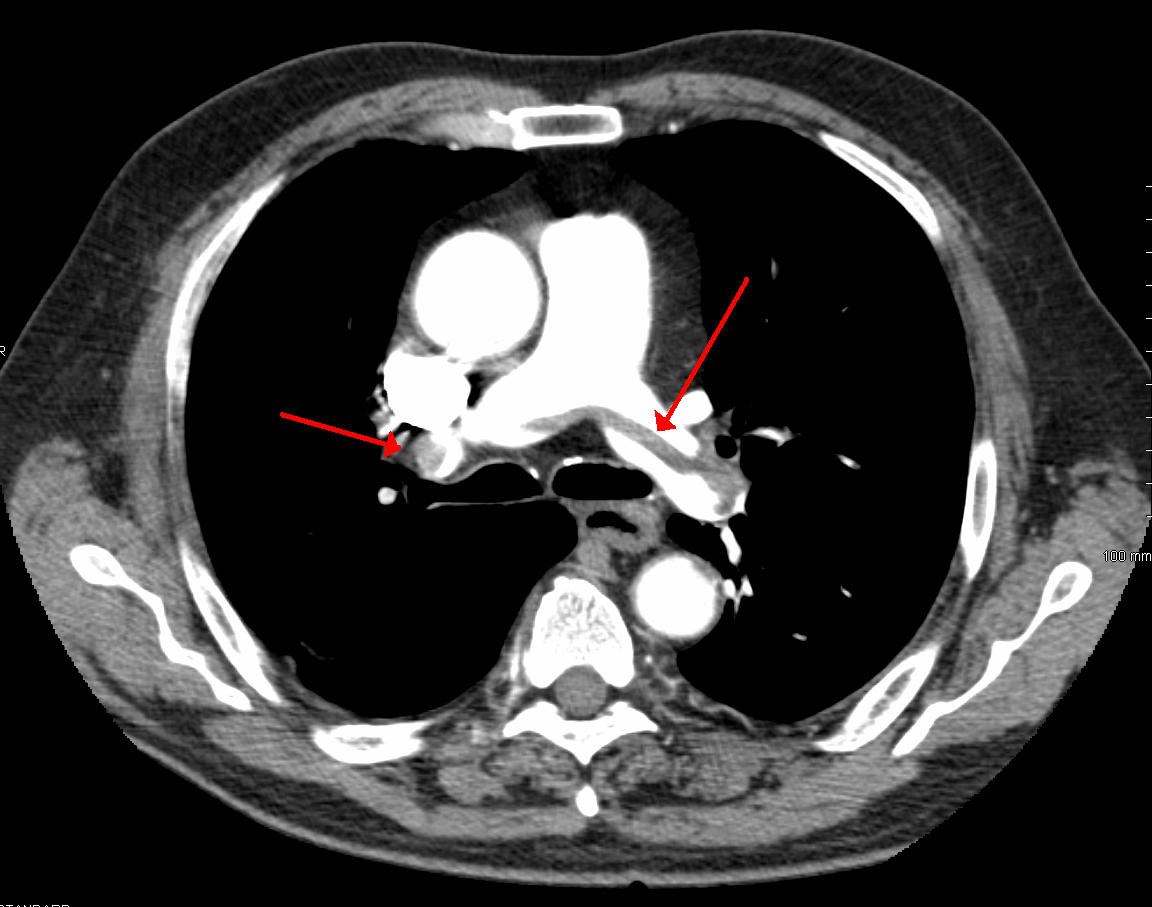
A CT image with red arrows indicating PE (grey) in the pulmonary arteries (white)

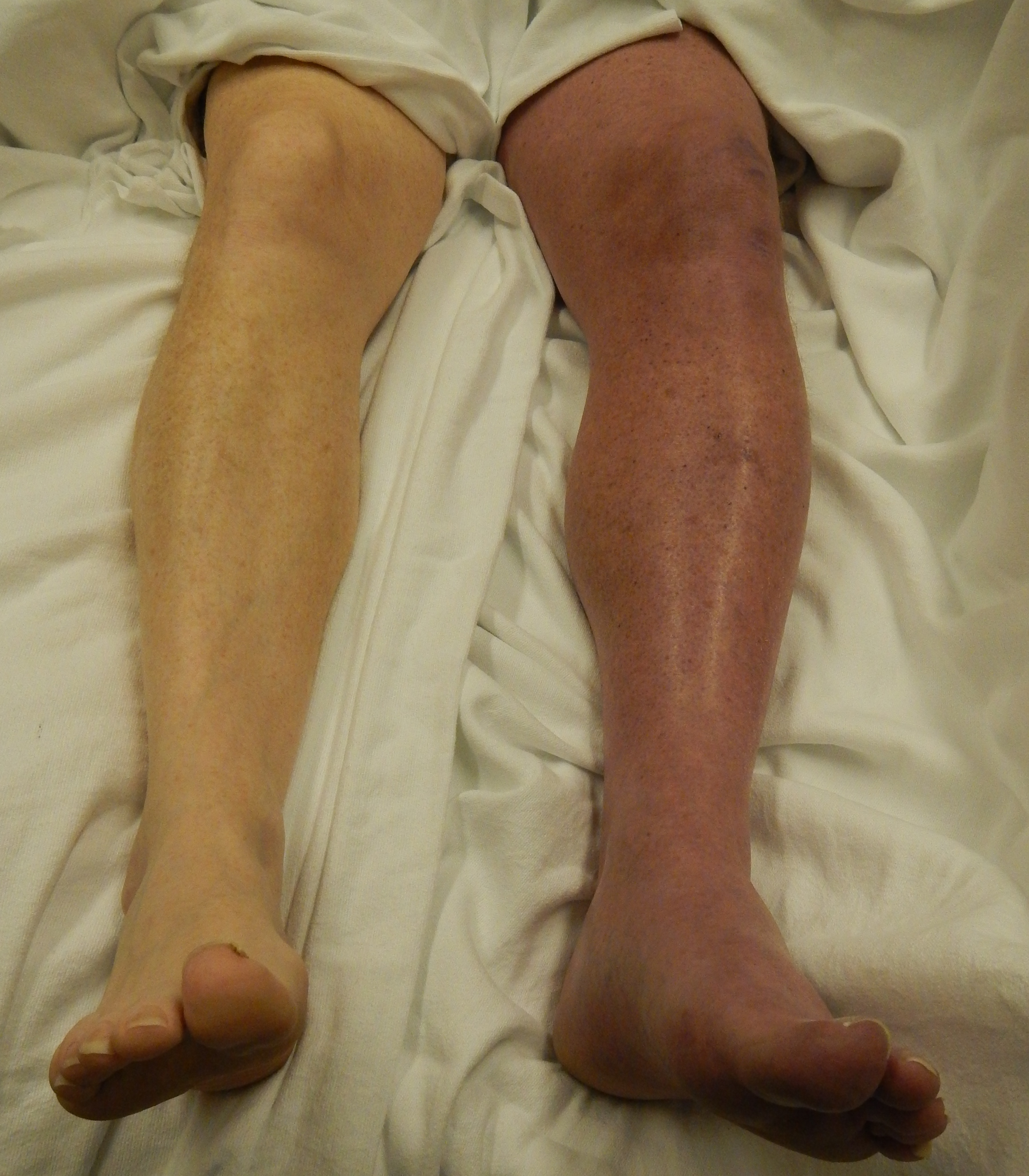
A case of phlegmasia cerulea dolens in the left leg

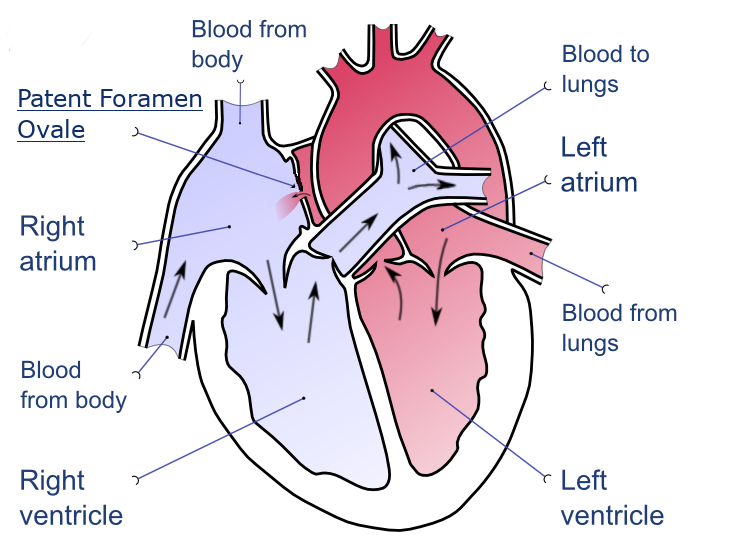
A depiction of a patent foramen ovale

=== Differential diagnosis ===
In most suspected cases, DVT is ruled out after evaluation. Cellulitis is a frequent mimic of DVT, with its triad of pain, swelling, and redness. Symptoms concerning for DVT are more often due to other causes, including cellulitis, ruptured Baker's cyst, hematoma, lymphedema, and chronic venous insufficiency. Other differential diagnoses include tumors, venous or arterial aneurysms, connective tissue disorders, superficial vein thrombosis, muscle vein thrombosis, and varicose veins.

== Classification ==
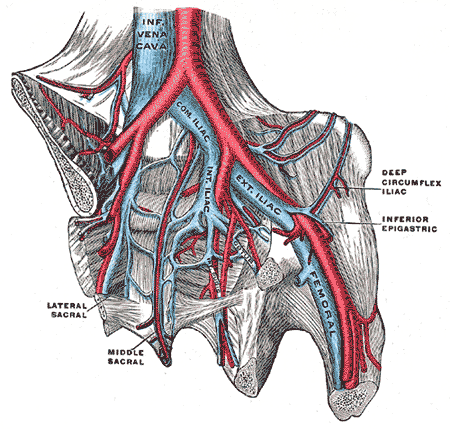
The iliac veins (in the pelvis) include the external iliac vein, the internal iliac vein, and the common iliac vein. The common femoral vein is below the external iliac vein. (It is labeled simply "femoral" here.)

DVT and PE are the two manifestations of the cardiovascular disease venous thromboembolism (VTE). VTE can occur as DVT only, DVT with PE, or PE only. About two-thirds of VTE manifests as DVT only, with one-third manifesting as PE with or without DVT. VTE, along with superficial vein thrombosis, are common types of venous thrombosis.

DVT is classified as acute when the clots are developing or have recently developed, whereas chronic DVT persists for more than 28 days. Differences between these two types of DVT can be seen with ultrasound. An episode of VTE after an initial one is classified as recurrent. Bilateral DVT refers to clots in both limbs while unilateral means only a single limb is affected.

DVT in a leg above the knee is termed proximal DVT (proximal). DVT in a leg below the knee is termed distal DVT (distal), also called calf DVT when affecting the calf, and has limited clinical significance compared to proximal DVT. Calf DVT makes up about half of DVTs. Iliofemoral DVT is described as involving either the iliac, or common femoral vein; elsewhere, it has been defined as involving at a minimum the common iliac vein, which is near the top of the pelvis.

DVT can be classified as provoked and unprovoked. For example, DVT that occurs in association with cancer or surgery can be classified as provoked. However, the European Society of Cardiology in 2019 urged for this dichotomy to be abandoned to encourage more personalized risk assessments for recurrent VTE. The distinction between these categories is not always clear.

== Causes ==
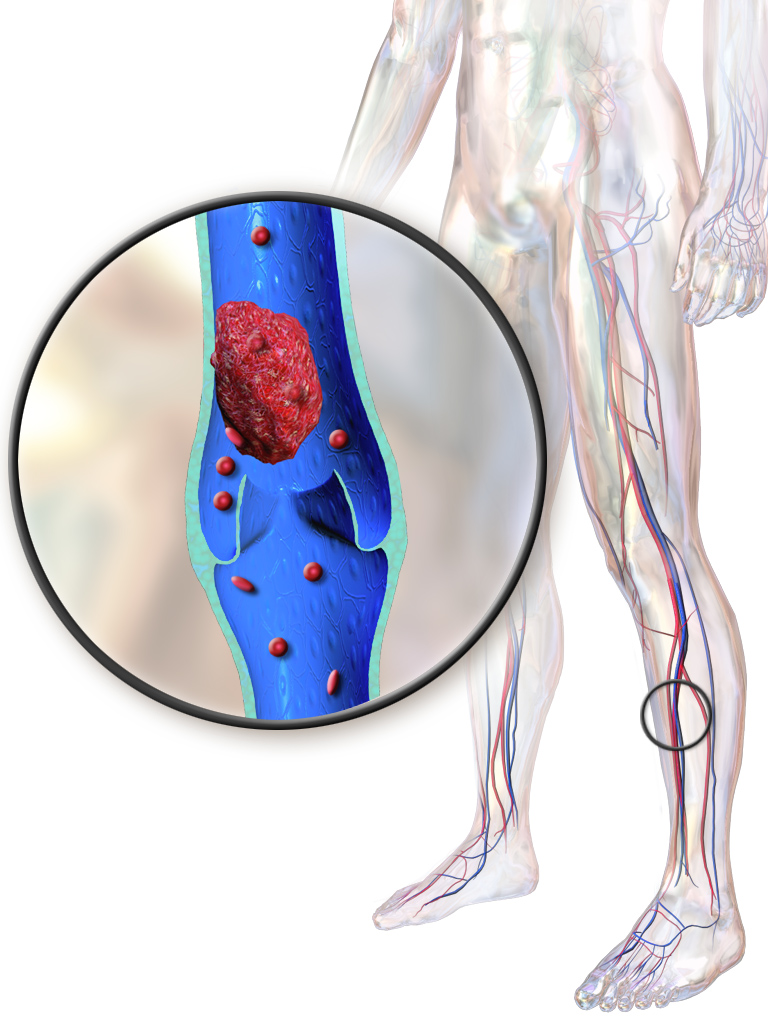
Depiction of DVT

Traditionally, the three factors of Virchow's triad—venous stasis, hypercoagulability, and changes in the endothelial blood vessel lining—contribute to VTE and were used to explain its formation. More recently, inflammation has been identified as playing a clear causal role. Other related causes include activation of immune system components, the state of microparticles in the blood, the concentration of oxygen, and possible platelet activation. Various risk factors contribute to VTE, including genetic and environmental factors, though many with multiple risk factors never develop it.

Acquired risk factors include the strong risk factor of older age, which alters blood composition to favor clotting. Previous VTE, particularly unprovoked VTE, is a strong risk factor. A leftover clot from a prior DVT increases the risk of a subsequent DVT. Major surgery and trauma increase risk because of tissue factor from outside the vascular system entering the blood. Minor injuries, lower limb amputation, hip fracture, and long bone fractures are also risks. In orthopedic surgery, venous stasis can be temporarily provoked by a cessation of blood flow as part of the procedure. Inactivity and immobilization contribute to venous stasis, as with orthopedic casts, paralysis, sitting, long-haul travel, bed rest, hospitalization, catatonia, and in survivors of acute stroke. Conditions that involve compromised blood flow in the veins are May–Thurner syndrome, where a vein of the pelvis is compressed, and venous thoracic outlet syndrome, which includes Paget–Schroetter syndrome, where compression occurs near the base of the neck.

Infections, including sepsis, COVID-19, HIV, and active tuberculosis, increase risk. Chronic inflammatory diseases and some autoimmune diseases, such as inflammatory bowel disease, systemic sclerosis, Behçet's syndrome, primary antiphospholipid syndrome, and systemic lupus erythematosus (SLE) increase risk. SLE itself is frequently associated with secondary antiphospholipid syndrome.

Cancer can grow in and around veins, causing venous stasis. It can also stimulate higher levels of tissue factor. Cancers of the blood, lung, pancreas, brain, stomach, and bowel are associated with high VTE risk. Solid tumors such as adenocarcinomas can contribute to both VTE and disseminated intravascular coagulation. In severe cases, this can lead to simultaneous clotting and bleeding. Chemotherapy treatment also increases risk. Obesity increases the potential of blood to clot, as does pregnancy. In the postpartum, placental tearing releases substances that favor clotting. Oral contraceptives (Note: Third-generation combined oral contraceptives (COCs) have an approximate two to three times higher risk than second-generation COCs. Progestogen-only pill use is not associated with increased VTE risk.) and hormonal replacement therapy increase the risk through various mechanisms, including altered blood coagulation protein levels and reduced fibrinolysis.

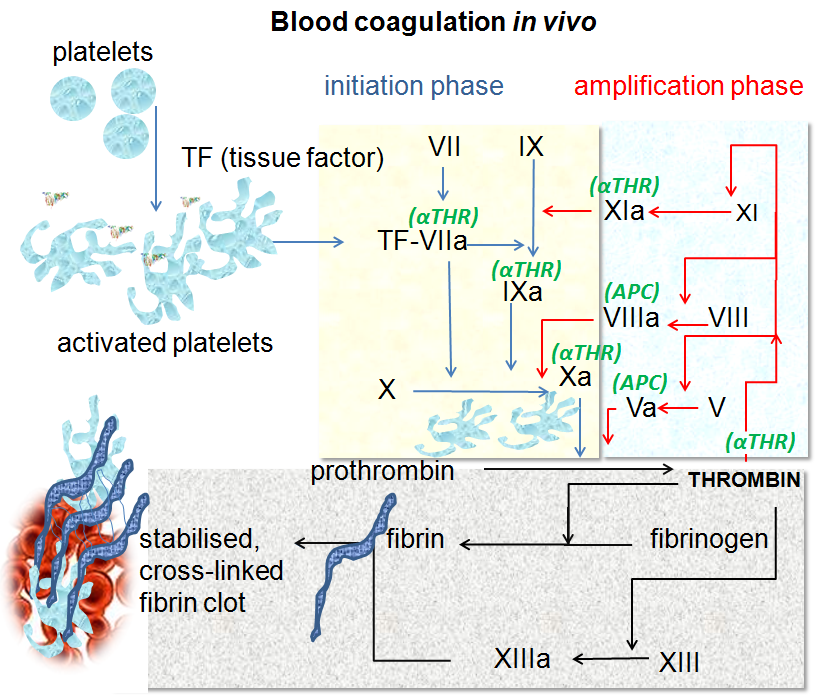
The coagulation system, often described as a "cascade", includes a group of proteins that regulate clotting. Abnormalities in the cascade can alter the risk of DVT. The regulators, antithrombin (ᾳTHR) and activated protein C (APC), are shown in green above the clotting factors they affect.

Dozens of genetic risk factors have been identified, and they account for approximately 50 to 60% of the variability in VTE rates. As such, family history of VTE is a risk factor for a first VTE. Factor V Leiden, which makes factor V resistant to inactivation by activated protein C, mildly increases VTE risk by about three times. Deficiencies of three proteins that normally prevent blood from clotting—protein C, protein S, and antithrombin—contribute to VTE. These deficiencies in antithrombin, protein C, and protein S (Note: Type I) are rare but strong, or moderately strong, risk factors. They increase risk by about 10 times. Having a non-O blood type roughly doubles VTE risk. Non-O blood type is common globally, making it an important risk factor. Individuals without O blood type have higher blood levels of von Willebrand factor and factor VIII than those with O blood type, increasing the likelihood of clotting. Those homozygous for the common fibrinogen gamma gene variant rs2066865 have about a 1.6 times higher risk of VTE. The genetic variant prothrombin G20210A, which increases prothrombin levels, increases risk by about 2.5 times. Additionally, approximately 5% of people have been identified with a background genetic risk comparable to the factor V Leiden and prothrombin G20210A mutations.

Blood alterations including dysfibrinogenemia, low free protein S, activated protein C resistance, homocystinuria, hyperhomocysteinemia, high fibrinogen levels, high factor IX levels, and high factor XI levels are associated with increased risk. Other associated conditions include heparin-induced thrombocytopenia, catastrophic antiphospholipid syndrome, paroxysmal nocturnal hemoglobinuria, nephrotic syndrome, chronic kidney disease, polycythemia vera, essential thrombocythemia, intravenous drug use, and smoking. (Note: "smoking is not an independent risk factor, although it increases the risk for cancers and other comorbidities and works synergistically with other independent risk factors.")

Some risk factors influence the location of DVT within the body. In isolated distal DVT, the profile of risk factors appears distinct from proximal DVT. Transient factors, such as surgery and immobilization, appear to dominate, whereas thrombophilias (Note: The term 'thrombophilia' as used here applies to the five inherited abnormalities of antithrombin, protein C, protein S, factor V, and prothrombin, as is done elsewhere. These 5 genetic factors have been referred to as the classical thrombophilias.) and age do not seem to increase risk. Common risk factors for having an upper extremity DVT include having an existing foreign body (such as a central venous catheter, a pacemaker, or a triple-lumen PICC line), cancer, and recent surgery.

== Pathophysiology ==
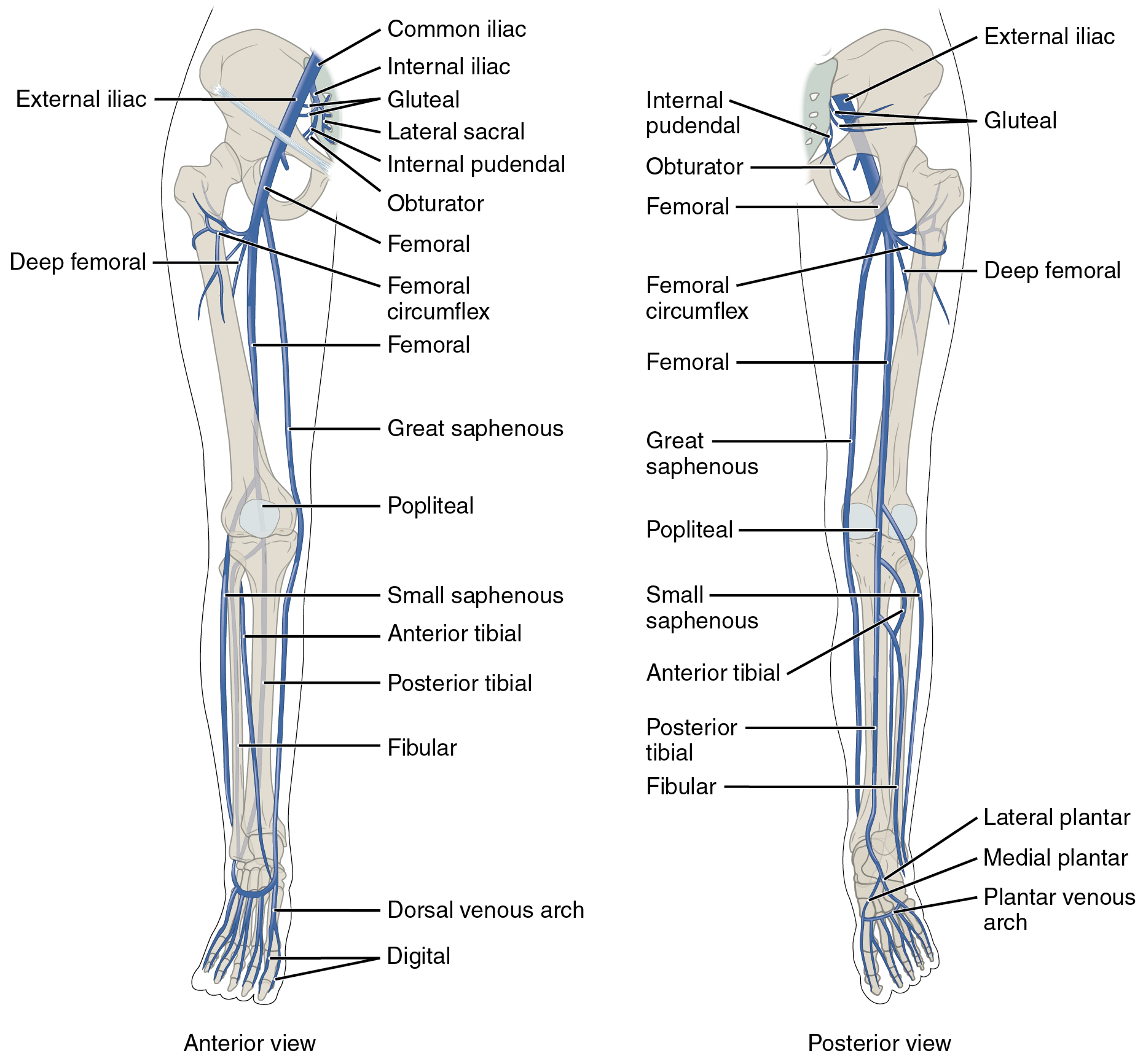
Lower Limb Veins (Anterior/Posterior views)

Blood has a natural tendency to clot when blood vessels are damaged (hemostasis) to minimize blood loss. Clotting is activated by the coagulation cascade, and the clearing of clots that are no longer needed is accomplished by the process of fibrinolysis. Reductions in fibrinolysis or increases in coagulation can increase the risk of DVT.

DVT often develops in the calf veins and "grows" in the direction of venous flow, towards the heart. DVT most frequently affects veins in the leg or pelvis including the popliteal vein (behind the knee), femoral vein (of the thigh), and iliac veins of the pelvis. Extensive lower-extremity DVT can even reach into the inferior vena cava (in the abdomen). Upper extremity DVT most commonly affects the subclavian, axillary, and jugular veins.

The process of fibrinolysis, where DVT clots can be dissolved back into the blood, tempers thrombus growth. This is the preferred process. Aside from the potentially deadly embolization process, a clot can resolve through organization, which can damage venous valves, cause venous fibrosis, and result in non-compliant veins. Organization of a thrombus into the vein can occur at the third stage of its pathological development, in which collagen becomes the characteristic component. The first pathological stage is marked by red blood cells, and the second is characterized by medium-textured fibrin.

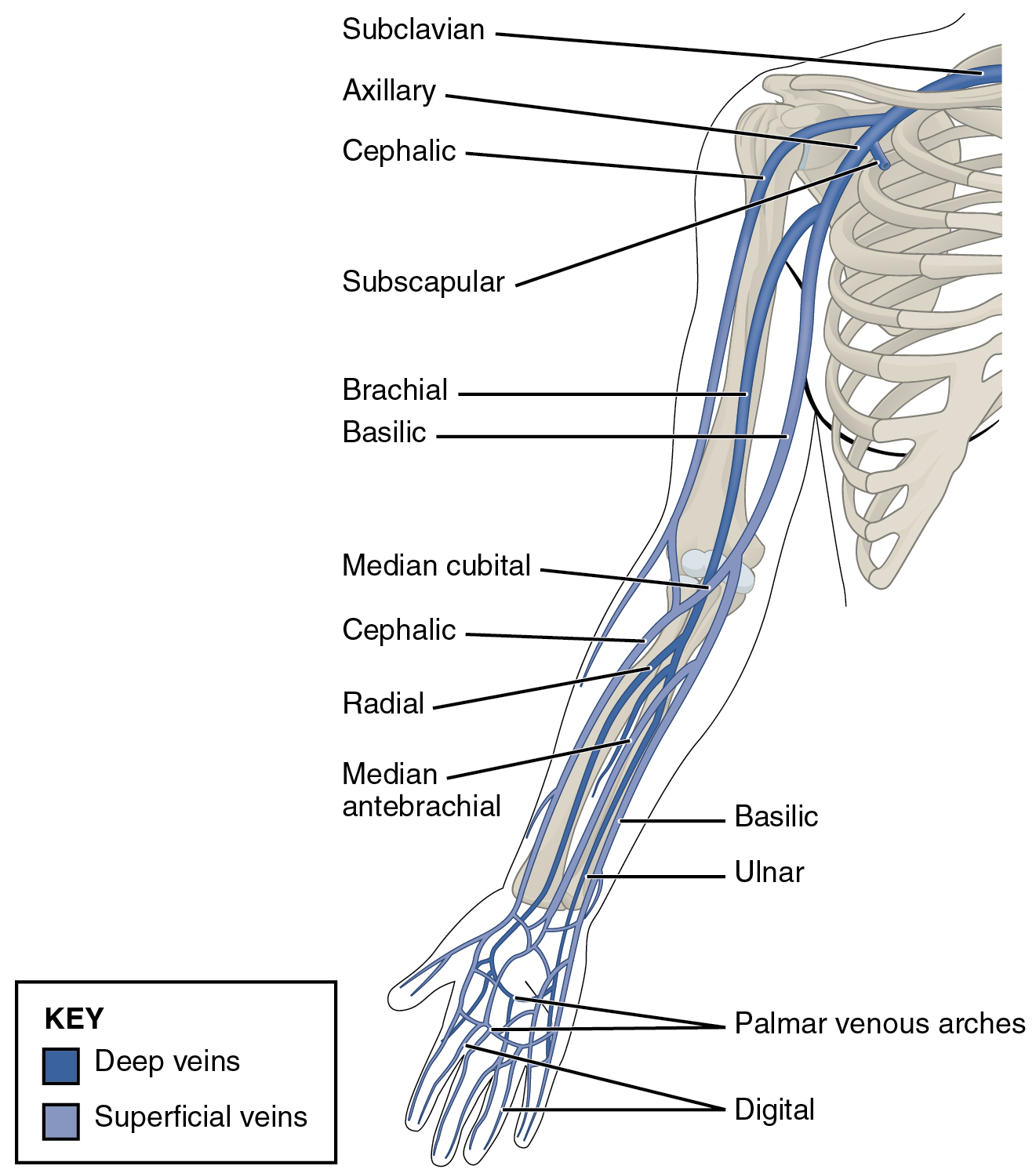
Upper extremity DVTs can occur in the subclavian, axillary, brachial, ulnar, and radial veins (pictured) and the jugular and brachiocephalic veins (not pictured). The cephalic and basilic veins, however, are superficial.

In arterial thrombosis, blood vessel wall damage is required, as it initiates coagulation, but clotting in the veins mostly occurs without any such mechanical damage. The beginning of venous thrombosis is thought to arise from "activation of endothelial cells, platelets, and leukocytes, with initiation of inflammation and formation of microparticles that trigger the coagulation system" via tissue factor. Vein wall inflammation is likely the inciting event. Importantly, the activated endothelium of veins interacts with circulating white blood cells (leukocytes). While leukocytes normally help prevent blood from clotting (as does normal endothelium), upon stimulation, leukocytes facilitate clotting. Neutrophils are recruited early in the process of venous thrombi formation. They release pro-coagulant granules and neutrophil extracellular traps (NETs) or their components, which play a role in venous thrombi formation. NET components are pro-thrombotic through both the intrinsic and extrinsic coagulation pathways. NETs provide "a scaffold for adhesion" of platelets, red blood cells, and multiple factors that potentiate platelet activation. In addition to the pro-coagulant activities of neutrophils, multiple stimuli cause monocytes to release tissue factor. Monocytes are also recruited early in the process.

Tissue factor, via the tissue factor–factor VIIa complex, activates the extrinsic pathway of coagulation and leads to conversion of prothrombin to thrombin, followed by fibrin deposition. Fresh venous clots are red blood cell and fibrin rich. Platelets and white blood cells are also components. Platelets are not as prominent in venous clots as they are in arterial ones, but they can play a role. In cancer, tissue factor is produced by cancer cells. Cancer also produces unique substances that stimulate factor Xa, cytokines that promote endothelial dysfunction, and plasminogen activator inhibitor-1, which inhibits the breakdown of clots (fibrinolysis).

D-dimer production

Often, DVT begins in the venous valves. The blood flow pattern in the valves can cause low oxygen concentrations in the blood (hypoxemia) of a valve sinus. Hypoxemia, which is worsened by venous stasis, activates pathways—ones that include hypoxia-inducible factor-1 and early-growth-response protein 1. Hypoxemia also results in the production of reactive oxygen species, which can activate these pathways, as well as nuclear factor-κB, which regulates hypoxia-inducible factor-1 transcription. Hypoxia-inducible factor-1 and early-growth-response protein 1 contribute to monocyte association with endothelial proteins, such as P-selectin, prompting monocytes to release tissue factor-filled microvesicles, which presumably begin clotting after binding to the endothelial surface.

D-dimers are a fibrin degradation product, a natural byproduct of fibrinolysis that is typically found in the blood. An elevated level (Note: An elevated level is greater than 250 ng/mL D-dimer units (DDU) or greater than 0.5 μg/mL fibrinogen equivalent units (FEU). A normal level is below these values.) can result from plasmin dissolving a clot—or other conditions. Hospitalized patients often have elevated levels for multiple reasons. Anticoagulation, the standard treatment for DVT, prevents further clot growth and PE, but does not act directly on existing clots.

== Diagnosis ==
A clinical probability assessment using the Wells score (see column in the table below) to determine if a potential DVT is "likely" or "unlikely" is typically the first step of the diagnostic process. The score is used in suspected first lower extremity DVT (without any PE symptoms) in primary care and outpatient settings, including the emergency department. The numerical result (possible score −2 to 9) is most commonly grouped into either "unlikely" or "likely" categories. A Wells score of two or more means DVT is considered "likely" (about a 28% chance), while those with a lower score are considered "unlikely" to have DVT (about a 6% chance). In those unlikely to have DVT, a diagnosis is excluded by a negative D-dimer blood test. In people with likely DVT, ultrasound is the standard imaging used to confirm or exclude a diagnosis. Imaging is also needed for hospital inpatients with suspected DVT and those initially categorized as unlikely to have DVT but who have a positive D-dimer test.

While the Wells score is the predominant and most studied clinical prediction rule for DVT, it does have drawbacks. The Wells score requires a subjective assessment regarding the likelihood of an alternate diagnosis and performs less well in the elderly and those with a prior DVT. The Dutch Primary Care Rule has also been validated for use. It contains only objective criteria but requires obtaining a D-dimer value. With this prediction rule, three points or less means a person is at low risk for DVT. A result of four or more points indicates an ultrasound is needed. Instead of using a prediction rule, experienced physicians can make a DVT pre-test probability assessment using clinical assessment and gestalt, but prediction rules are more reliable.

Criteria	Wells score for DVT (Note: The Wells score as displayed here is the more recent modified score, which added a criterion for a previously documented DVT and increased the time range after surgery to 12 weeks from 4 weeks.)	Dutch Primary Care Rule
Active cancer (treatment within the last 6 months or palliative)	+1 point	+1 point
Calf swelling ≥ 3 cm compared to asymptomatic calf (measured 10 cm below tibial tuberosity)	+1 point	+2 points
Swollen unilateral superficial veins (non-varicose, in a symptomatic leg)	+1 point	+1 point
Unilateral pitting edema (in symptomatic leg)	+1 point	—
Previous documented DVT	+1 point	—
Swelling of the entire leg	+1 point	—
Localized tenderness along the deep venous system	+1 point	—
Paralysis, paresis, or recent cast immobilization of lower extremities	+1 point	—
Recently bedridden ≥ 3 days, or major surgery requiring regional or general anesthetic in the past 12 weeks	+1 point	+1 point
Alternative diagnosis at least as likely	−2 points	—
Positive D-dimer (≥ 0.5 mcg/mL or 1.7 nmol/L)	—	+6 points
Absence of leg trauma	—	+1 point
Male sex	—	+1 point
Use of oral contraceptives	—	+1 point

Compression ultrasonography for suspected deep vein thrombosis is the standard diagnostic method, and it is highly sensitive for detecting an initial DVT. A compression ultrasound is considered positive when the vein walls of normally compressible veins do not collapse under gentle pressure. Clot visualization is sometimes possible, but is not required. Three compression ultrasound scanning techniques can be used, with two of the three methods requiring a second ultrasound some days later to rule out the diagnosis. Whole-leg ultrasound is the option that does not require a repeat ultrasound, but proximal compression ultrasound is frequently used because distal DVT is only rarely clinically significant. Ultrasound methods including duplex and color flow Doppler can be used to characterize the clot further and Doppler ultrasound is especially helpful in the non-compressible iliac veins.

CT scan venography, MRI venography, or a non-contrast MRI are also diagnostic possibilities. The gold standard for judging imaging methods is contrast venography, which involves injecting a peripheral vein of the affected limb with a contrast agent and taking X-rays, to reveal whether the venous supply has been obstructed. Because of its cost, invasiveness, availability, and other limitations, this test is rarely performed.

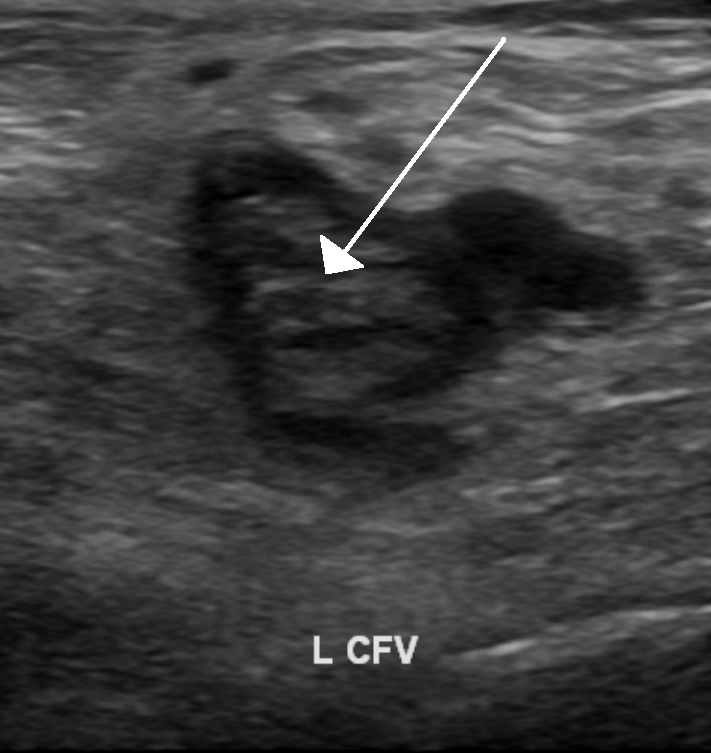
An ultrasound with a blood clot visible in the left common femoral vein. (The common femoral vein is distal to the external iliac vein.)

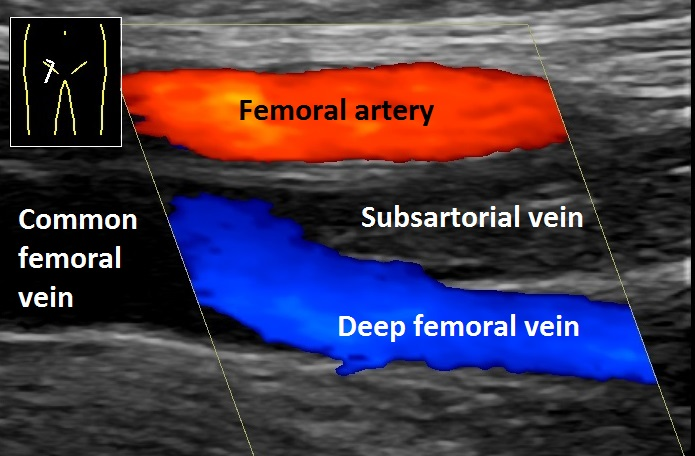
Doppler ultrasonography showing absence of flow and hyperechogenic content in a clotted femoral vein (labeled subsartorial (Note: Subsartorial is a proposed name for a section of the femoral vein.)) distal to the branching point of the deep femoral vein. When compared to this clot, clots that instead obstruct the common femoral vein (proximal to this branching point) cause more severe effects due to impacting a significantly larger portion of the leg.

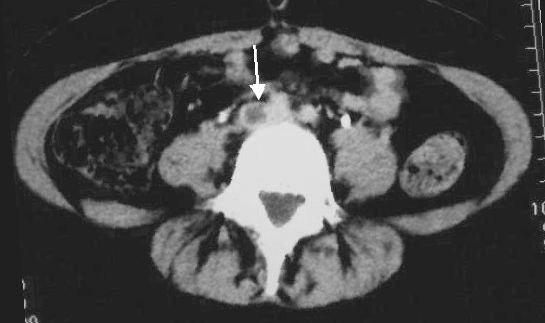
An abdominal CT scan demonstrating an iliofemoral DVT, with the clot in the right common iliac vein of the pelvis

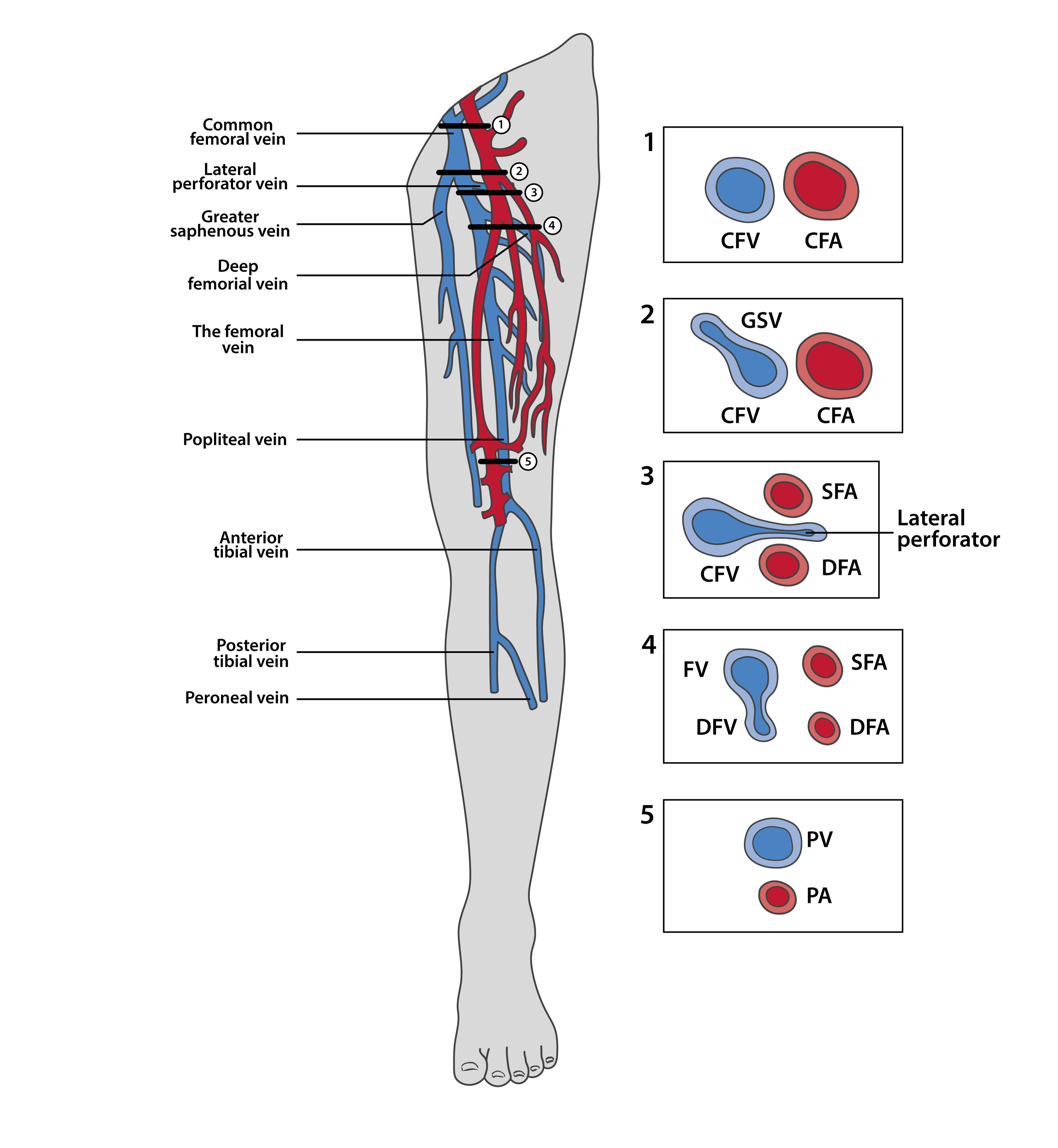
Vascular anatomy for deep venous thrombosis (DVT) point of care ultrasound (POCUS)

== Management ==
Treatment for DVT is warranted when the clots are either proximal, distal, and symptomatic, or upper extremity and symptomatic. Providing anticoagulation, or blood-thinning medicine, is the typical treatment after patients are checked to make sure they are not subject to bleeding. (Note: Evidence for anticoagulation comes from studies other than definitive randomized controlled trials that demonstrate efficacy and safety for anticoagulation vs. placebo or using NSAIDs.) However, treatment varies depending upon the location of DVT. For example, in cases of isolated distal DVT, ultrasound surveillance (a second ultrasound after 2 weeks to check for proximal clots), might be used instead of anticoagulation. Although, those with isolated distal DVT at a high risk of VTE recurrence are typically anticoagulated as if they had proximal DVT. Those at low risk of recurrence might receive a four- to six-week course of anticoagulation, lower doses, or no anticoagulation at all. In contrast, those with proximal DVT should receive at least 3 months of anticoagulation.

Some anticoagulants can be taken by mouth, and these oral medicines include warfarin (a vitamin K antagonist), rivaroxaban (a factor Xa inhibitor), apixaban (a factor Xa inhibitor), dabigatran (a direct thrombin inhibitor), and edoxaban (a factor Xa inhibitor). Other anticoagulants cannot be taken by mouth. These parenteral (non-oral) medicines include low-molecular-weight heparin (LMWH), fondaparinux, and unfractionated heparin. Some oral medicines are sufficient when taken alone, while others require an additional parenteral blood thinner. Rivaroxaban and apixaban are the typical first-line medicines, and they are sufficient when taken orally. Rivaroxaban is taken once daily, and apixaban is taken twice daily. Warfarin, dabigatran, and edoxaban require the use of a parenteral anticoagulant to initiate oral anticoagulant therapy. When warfarin is initiated for VTE treatment, a 5-day minimum of a parenteral anticoagulant (Note: The international normalized ratio should be ≥ 2.0 for 24 hours minimum, but if the ratio is > 3.0, then the parenteral anticoagulant is not needed for five days.) together with warfarin is given, which is followed by warfarin-only therapy. Warfarin is taken to maintain an international normalized ratio (INR) (Note: An INR is determined from the ratio of a patient's prothrombin time (PT) to a standardized control PT. A normal INR for those not on anticoagulation is 1.0. A value of 5.0 or higher is considered a critical finding because of an increased risk of bleeding.) of 2.0–3.0, with 2.5 as the target. The benefit of taking warfarin declines as the duration of treatment extends, and the risk of bleeding increases with age. Periodic INR monitoring is not necessary when first-line direct oral anticoagulants are used. Overall, anticoagulation therapy is complex, and many circumstances can affect how these therapies are managed.

Structural representations of the backbone of heparins (left), which vary in the size of their chain, and the synthetic pentasaccharide (five-sugar) fondaparinux (right)

The duration of anticoagulation therapy (whether it will last 4 to 6 weeks, 6 to 12 weeks, 3 to 6 months, or indefinitely) is a key factor in clinical decision making. When proximal DVT is provoked by surgery or trauma a 3-month course of anticoagulation is standard. When a first VTE is proximal DVT that is either unprovoked or associated with transient non-surgical risk factor, low-dose anticoagulation beyond 3 to 6 months might be used. In those with an annual risk of VTE in excess of 9%, as after an unprovoked episode, extended anticoagulation is a possibility. Those who finish warfarin treatment after idiopathic VTE with an elevated D-dimer level show an increased risk of recurrent VTE (about 9% vs about 4% for normal results), and this result might be used in clinical decision making. Thrombophilia test results rarely play a role in the length of treatment.

Treatment for acute leg DVT is suggested to continue at home for uncomplicated DVT instead of hospitalization. Factors that favor hospitalization include severe symptoms or additional medical issues. Early walking is suggested over bedrest. Graduated compression stockings—which apply higher pressure at the ankles and a lower pressure around the knees can be trialed for symptomatic management of acute DVT symptoms, but they are not recommended for reducing the risk of post-thrombotic syndrome, as the potential benefit of using them for this goal "may be uncertain". Nor are compression stockings likely to reduce VTE recurrence. They are, however, recommended in those with isolated distal DVT.

If someone decides to stop anticoagulation after an unprovoked VTE instead of being on lifelong anticoagulation, aspirin can be used to reduce the risk of recurrence. It is only about 33% as effective as anticoagulation in preventing recurrent VTE. Statins have also been investigated for their potential to reduce recurrent VTE rates, with some studies suggesting effectiveness.

=== Investigations for cancer ===
An unprovoked VTE might signal the presence of an unknown cancer, as it is an underlying condition in up to 10% of unprovoked cases. A thorough clinical assessment is needed and should include a physical examination, a review of medical history, and universal cancer screening done in people of that age. A review of prior imaging is considered worthwhile, as is "reviewing baseline blood test results including full blood count, renal and hepatic function, PT and APTT." It is not recommended practice to obtain tumor markers or a CT of the abdomen and pelvis in asymptomatic individuals. NICE recommends that further investigations are unwarranted in those without relevant signs or symptoms.

=== Interventions ===
Thrombolysis is the injection of an enzyme into the veins to dissolve blood clots, and while this treatment has been proven effective against the life-threatening emergency clots of stroke and heart attacks, randomized controlled trials have not established a net benefit in those with acute proximal DVT. Drawbacks of catheter-directed thrombolysis (the preferred method of administering the clot-busting enzyme) include a risk of bleeding, complexity, (Note: "Up to 83% of patients treated by any catheter-based therapy, need adjunctive angioplasty, and stenting".) and the cost of the procedure. Although, while anticoagulation is the preferred treatment for DVT, thrombolysis is a treatment option for those with the severe DVT form of phlegmasia cerula dorens (bottom left image) and in some younger patients with DVT affecting the iliac and common femoral veins. Of note, a variety of contraindications to thrombolysis exist. In 2020, NICE kept their 2012 recommendations that catheter-directed thrombolysis should be considered in those with iliofemoral DVT who have "symptoms lasting less than 14 days, good functional status, a life expectancy of 1 year or more, and a low risk of bleeding."

A mechanical thrombectomy device can remove DVT clots, particularly in acute iliofemoral DVT (DVT of the major veins in the pelvis), but there is limited data on its efficacy. It is usually combined with thrombolysis, and sometimes, temporary IVC filters are placed to protect against PE during the procedure. Catheter-directed thrombolysis with thrombectomy against iliofemoral DVT has been associated with a reduction in the severity of post-thrombotic syndrome at an estimated cost-effectiveness ratio of about $138,000 (Note: Estimated in United States dollars, estimate published in 2019) per gained QALY. Phlegmasia cerulea dolens might be treated with catheter-directed thrombolysis and/or thrombectomy.

In DVT in the arm, the first (topmost) rib can be surgically removed as part of the typical treatment when the DVT is due to thoracic outlet syndrome or Paget–Schroetter syndrome. This treatment involves initial anticoagulation followed by thrombolysis of the subclavian vein and staged first rib resection to relieve the thoracic outlet compression and prevent recurrent DVT.

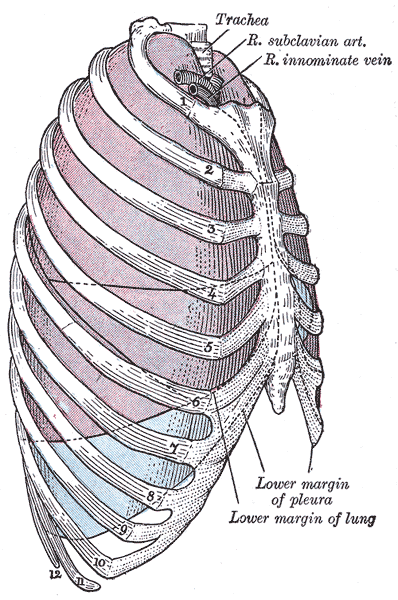
The first rib, which is removed in a first rib resection surgery, is labeled 1 in this image

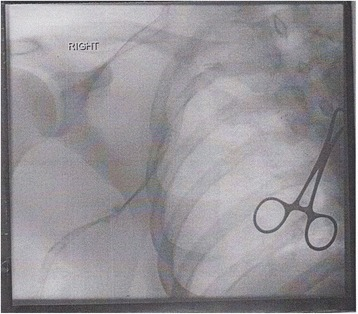
A venogram before catheter-directed thrombolysis for Paget–Schroetter syndrome, a rare and severe arm DVT shown here in a judo practitioner, with highly restricted blood flow shown in the vein

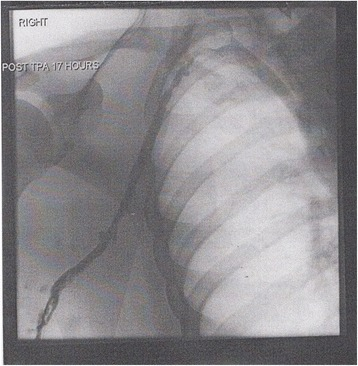
After treatment with catheter-directed thrombolysis, blood flow in the axillary and subclavian vein was significantly improved. Afterwards, a first rib resection allowed decompression. This reduces the risk of recurrent DVT and other sequelae from thoracic outlet compression.

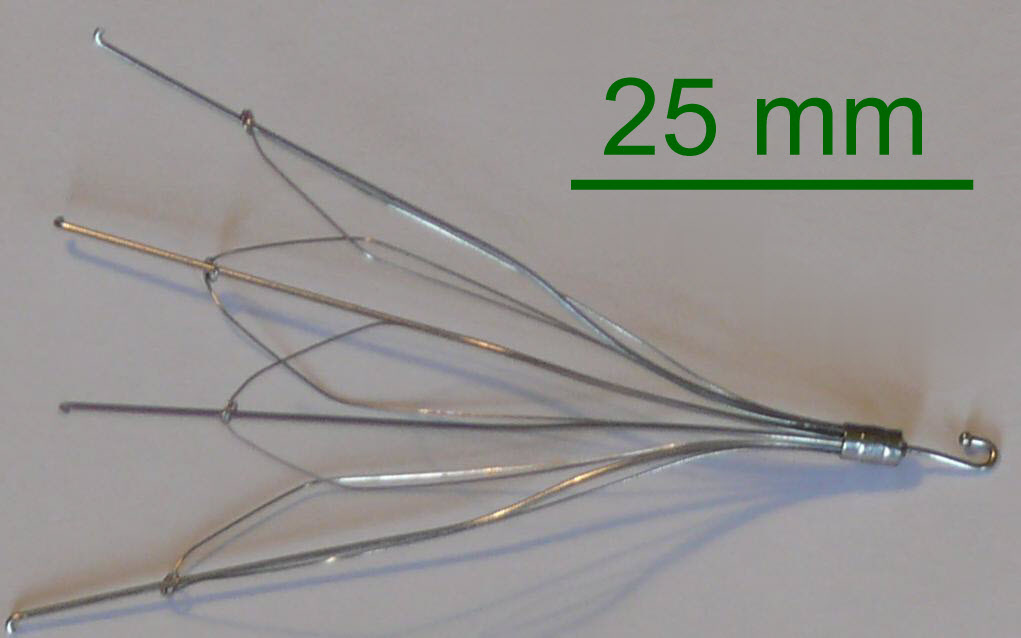
An IVC filter

The placement of an inferior vena cava filter (IVC filter) is possible when either the standard treatment for acute DVT, anticoagulation, is absolutely contraindicated (not possible), or if someone develops a PE despite being anticoagulated. However, a 2020 NICE review found "little good evidence" for their use. A 2018 study associated IVC filter placement with a 50% reduction in PE, a 70% increase in DVT, and an 18% increase in 30 day mortality when compared to no IVC placement. Other studies including a systematic review and meta-analysis did not find a difference in mortality with IVC placement. If someone develops a PE despite being anticoagulated, care should be given to optimize anticoagulation treatment and address other related concerns before considering IVC filter placement.

=== Field of medicine ===
Patients with a history of DVT might be managed by primary care, general internal medicine, hematology, cardiology, vascular surgery, or vascular medicine. Patients suspected of having an acute DVT are often referred to the emergency department for evaluation. Interventional radiology is the specialty that typically places and retrieves IVC filters, and vascular surgery might do catheter directed thrombosis for some severe DVTs.

== Prevention ==
For the prevention of blood clots in the general population, incorporating leg exercises while sitting down for long periods, or having breaks from a sitting position and walking around, having an active lifestyle, and maintaining a healthy body weight are recommended. Walking increases blood flow through the leg veins. Excess body weight is modifiable, unlike most risk factors, and interventions or lifestyle modifications that help someone who is overweight or obese lose weight reduce DVT risk. Avoiding both smoking and a Western pattern diet are thought to reduce risk. Statins have been investigated for primary prevention (prevention of a first VTE), and the JUPITER trial, which used rosuvastatin, has provided some tentative evidence of effectiveness. Of the statins, rosuvastatin appears to be the only one with the potential to reduce VTE risk. If so, it appears to reduce risk by about 15%. However, the number needed to treat to prevent one initial VTE is about 2000, limiting its applicability.

=== Hospital (non-surgical) patients ===
Acutely ill hospitalized patients are suggested to receive a parenteral anticoagulant, although the potential net benefit is uncertain. Critically ill hospitalized patients are recommended to either receive unfractionated heparin or low-molecular weight heparin instead of foregoing these medicines.

=== After surgery ===
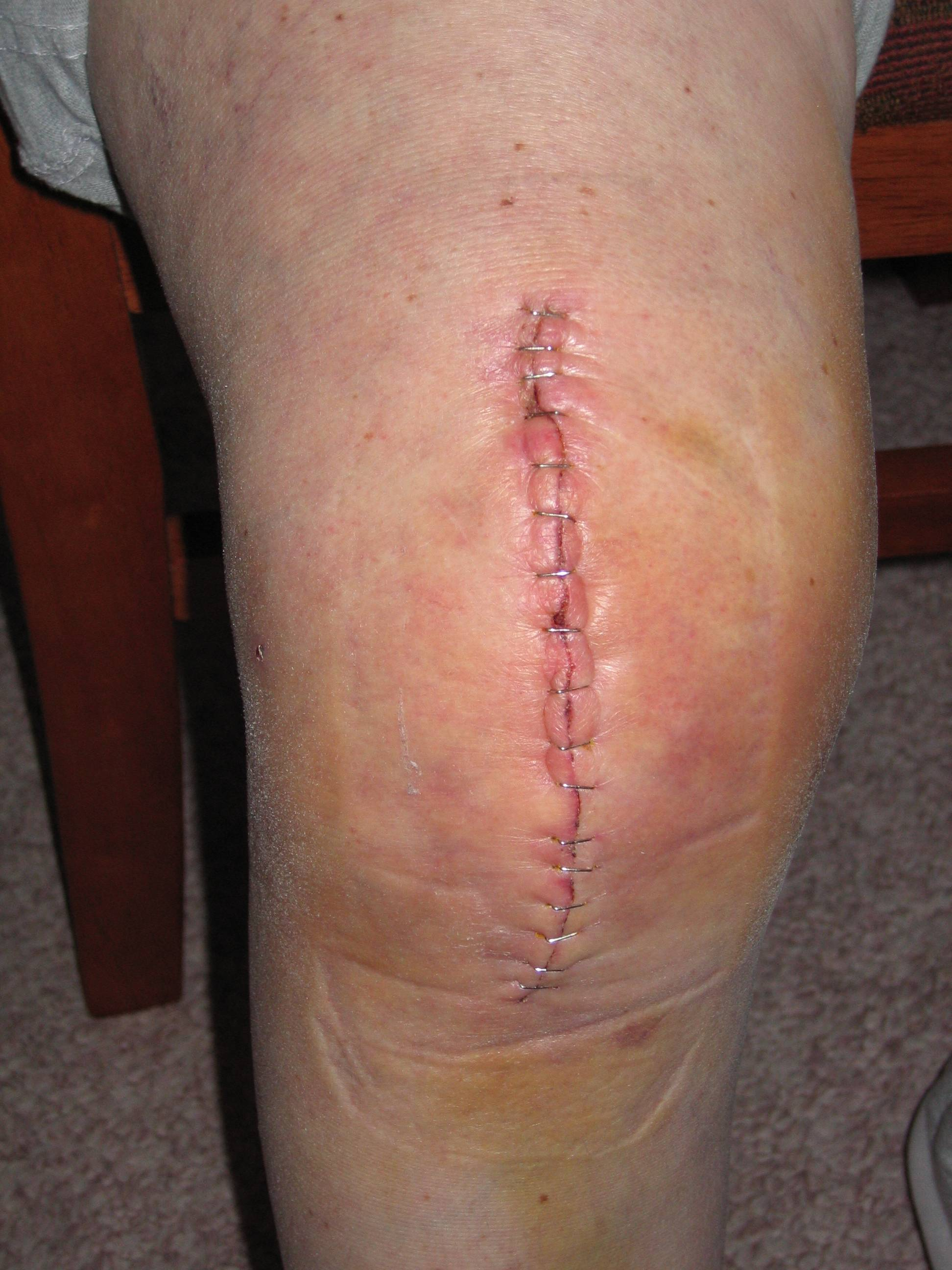
The incision for a completed knee replacement surgery, a procedure that can precipitate DVT formation

Major orthopedic surgery—total hip replacement, total knee replacement, or hip fracture surgery—has a high risk of causing VTE. If prophylaxis is not used after these surgeries, symptomatic VTE has about a 4% chance of developing within 35 days. Following major orthopedic surgery, a blood thinner or aspirin is typically paired with intermittent pneumatic compression, which is the preferred mechanical prophylaxis over graduated compression stockings.

Options for VTE prevention in people following non-orthopedic surgery include early walking, mechanical prophylaxis, and blood thinners (low-molecular-weight heparin and low-dose unfractionated heparin), depending on the risk of VTE, risk of major bleeding, and the person's preferences. After low-risk surgeries, early and frequent walking is the best preventive measure.

=== Pregnancy ===
The risk of VTE is increased in pregnancy by about four to five times because of a more hypercoagulable state that protects against fatal postpartum hemorrhage. Preventive measures for pregnancy-related VTE were suggested by the American Society of Hematology in 2018. Warfarin, a common vitamin K antagonist, can cause birth defects and is not used for prevention during pregnancy.

=== Travelers ===
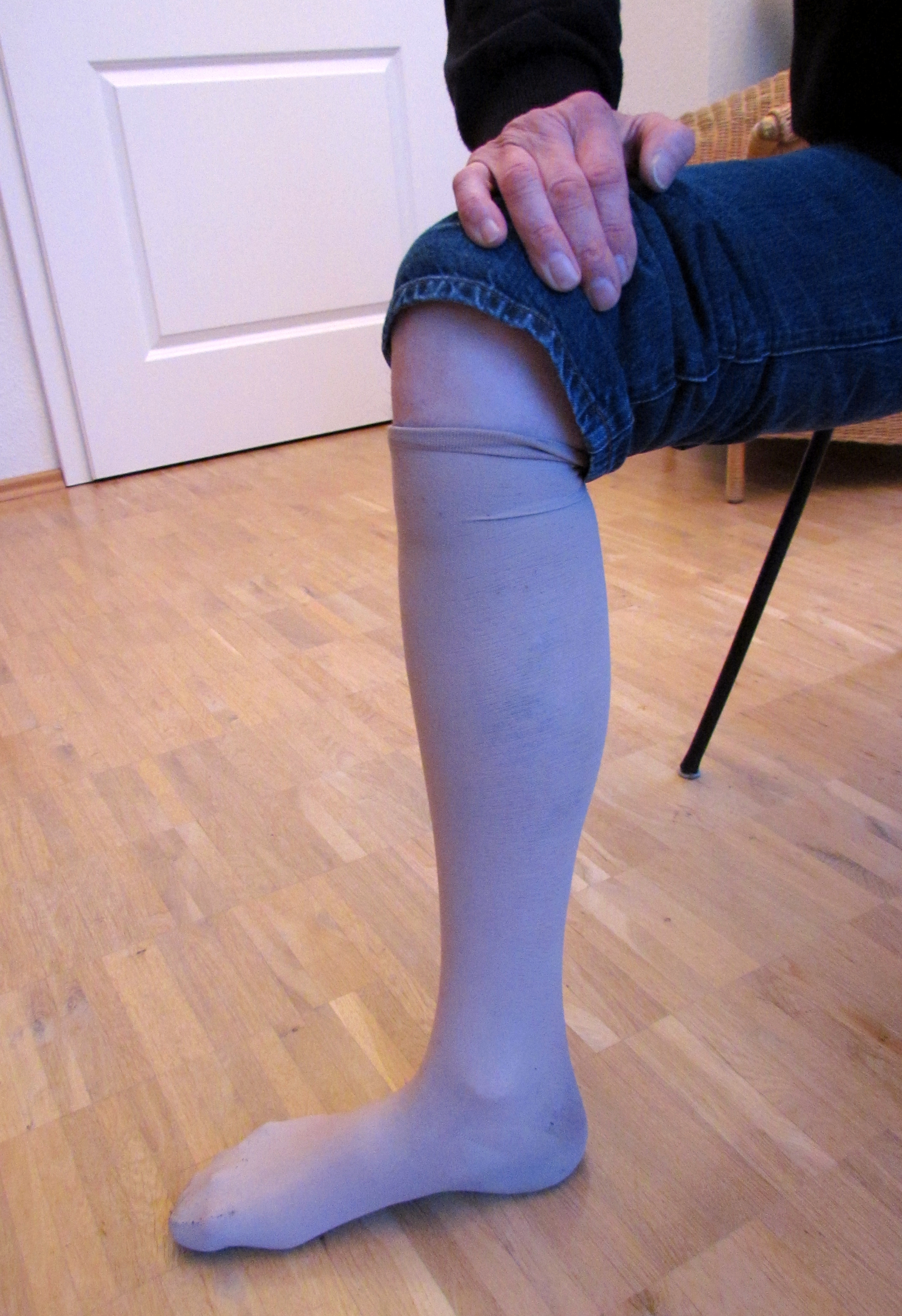
An example of a compression stocking

Travelling "is an often cited yet relatively uncommon" cause of VTE. Suggestions for at-risk (Note: Including those with "previous VTE, recent surgery or trauma, active malignancy, pregnancy, estrogen use, advanced age, limited mobility, severe obesity, or known thrombophilic disorder") long-haul travelers include calf exercises, frequent walking, and aisle seating in airplanes to ease walking. Graduated compression stockings have sharply reduced the levels of asymptomatic DVT in airline passengers, but the effect on symptomatic DVT, PE, or mortality is unknown, as none of the individuals studied developed these outcomes. However, graduated compression stockings are not suggested for long-haul travelers (>4 hours) without risk factors for VTE. Likewise, neither aspirin nor anticoagulants are suggested in the general population undertaking long-haul travel. Those with significant VTE risk factors (Note: For example "recent surgery, history of VTE, postpartum women, active malignancy, or ≥2 risk factors, including combinations of the above with hormone replacement therapy, obesity, or pregnancy") undertaking long-haul travel are suggested to use either graduated compression stockings or LMWH for VTE prevention. If neither of these two methods are feasible, then aspirin is suggested.

== Prognosis ==
DVT is most frequently a disease of older age that occurs in the context of nursing homes, hospitals, and active cancer. It is associated with a 30-day mortality rate of about 6%, with PE being the cause of most of these deaths. Proximal DVT is frequently associated with PE, unlike distal DVT, which is rarely if ever associated with PE. Around 56% of those with proximal DVT also have PE, although a chest CT is not needed simply because of the presence of DVT. If proximal DVT is left untreated, in the following 3 months approximately half of people will experience symptomatic PE.

Another frequent complication of proximal DVT, and the most frequent chronic complication, is post-thrombotic syndrome, where individuals have chronic venous symptoms. Symptoms can include pain, itching, swelling, paresthesia, a sensation of heaviness, and in severe cases, leg ulcers. After proximal DVT, an estimated 20–50% of people develop the syndrome, with 5–10% experiencing severe symptoms. Post-thrombotic syndrome can also be a complication of distal DVT, though to a lesser extent than with proximal DVT.

In the 10 years following an initial VTE, about 30% of people will have a recurrence. VTE recurrence in those with prior DVT is more likely to recur as DVT than PE. Cancer and unprovoked DVT are strong risk factors for recurrence. After initial proximal unprovoked DVT with and without PE, 16–17% of people will have recurrent VTE in the 2 years after they complete their course of anticoagulants. VTE recurrence is less common in distal DVT than proximal DVT. In upper extremity DVT, annual VTE recurrence is about 2–4%. After surgery, a provoked proximal DVT or PE has an annual recurrence rate of only 0.7%.

== Epidemiology ==
About 1.5 out of 1000 adults a year have a first VTE in high-income countries. The condition becomes much more common with age. VTE rarely occurs in children, but when it does, it predominantly affects hospitalized children. Children in North America and the Netherlands have VTE rates that range from 0.07 to 0.49 out of 10,000 children annually. Meanwhile, almost 1% of those aged 85 and above experience VTE each year. About 60% of all VTEs occur in those 70 years of age or older. Incidence is about 18% higher in males than in females, though there are ages when VTE is more prevalent in women. VTE occurs in association with hospitalization or nursing home residence about 60% of the time, active cancer about 20% of the time, and a central venous catheter or transvenous pacemaker about 9% of the time.

During pregnancy and after childbirth, acute VTE occurs in about 1.2 of 1000 deliveries. Despite it being relatively rare, it is a leading cause of maternal morbidity and mortality. After surgery with preventive treatment, VTE develops in about 10 of 1000 people after total or partial knee replacement, and in about 5 of 1000 after total or partial hip replacement. About 400,000 Americans develop an initial VTE each year, with 100,000 deaths or more attributable to PE. Asian, Asian-American, Native American, and Hispanic individuals have a lower VTE risk than white or Black people. Populations in Asia have VTE rates at 15 to 20% of what is seen in Western countries, with an increase in incidence seen over time. In North American and European populations, around 4–8% of people have a thrombophilia, most commonly factor V Leiden and prothrombin G20210A. In China, Japan, and Thailand, deficiencies in protein S, protein C, and antithrombin predominate. Non-O blood type is present in around 50% of the general population and varies with ethnicity, and it is present in about 70% of those with VTE.

DVT occurs in the upper extremities in about 4–10% of cases, with an incidence of 0.4–1.0 cases per 10,000 a year. A minority of upper extremity DVTs are due to Paget–Schroetter syndrome, also called effort thrombosis, which occurs in 1–2 people out of 100,000 a year, usually in athletic males around 30 years of age or in those who do significant amounts of overhead manual labor.

== Social ==
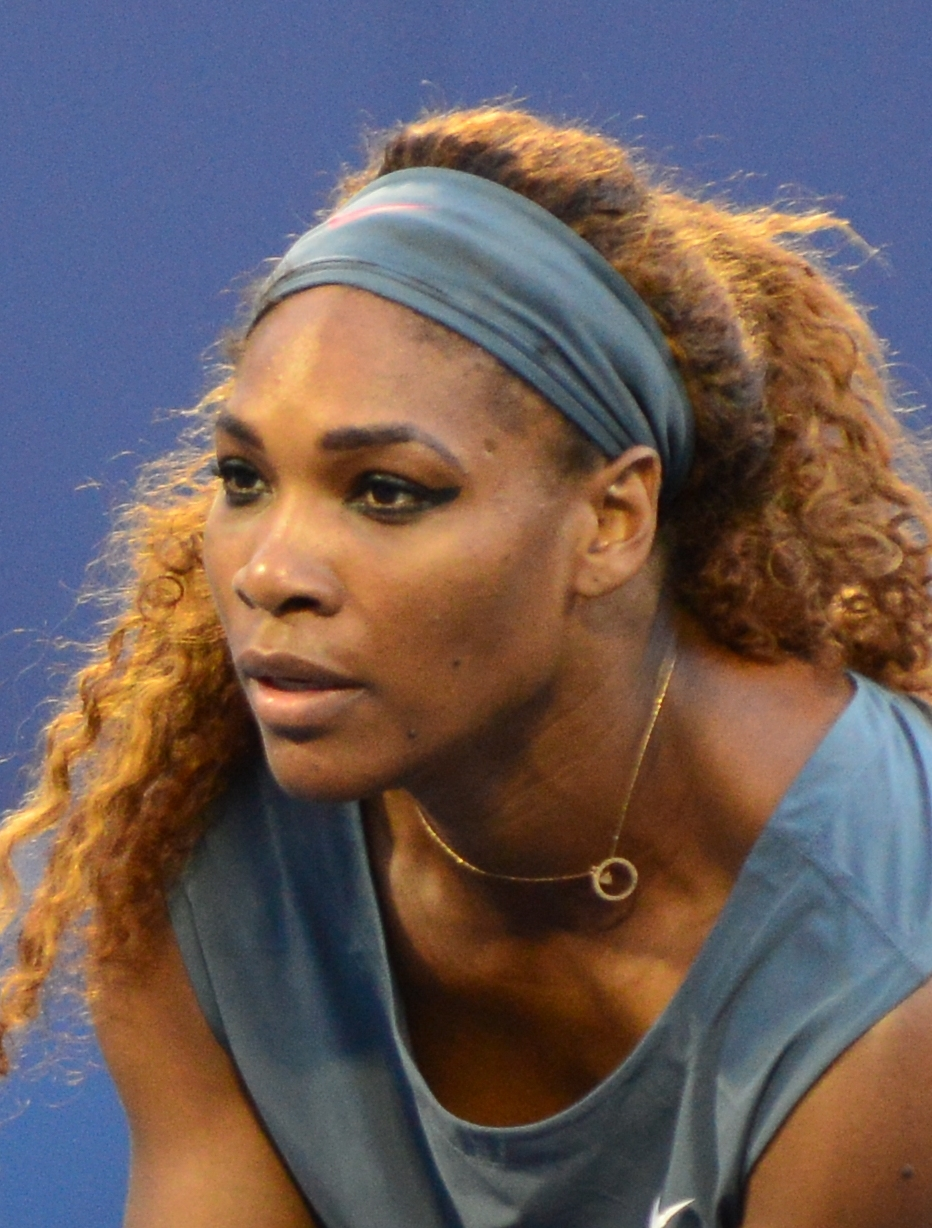
Serena Williams has spoken at length about a frightening encounter she had with VTE while she was hospitalized in 2017.

Being on blood thinners because of DVT can be life-changing because it can prevent lifestyle activities such as contact or winter sports, and prevent bleeding after potential injuries. Head injuries prompting brain bleeds are of particular concern. This has caused NASCAR driver Brian Vickers to forgo participation in races. Professional basketball players including NBA players Victor Wembanyama, Chris Bosh, and hall of famer Hakeem Olajuwon have dealt with recurrent blood clots, and Bosh's career was significantly hampered by DVT and PE.

Tennis star Serena Williams was hospitalized in 2011 for PE thought to have originated from DVT. Years later, in 2017, due to her knowledge of DVT and PE, Serena accurately advocated for herself to have a PE diagnosed and treated. During this encounter with VTE, she was hospitalized after a C-section surgery and was off blood thinners. After feeling the sudden onset of a PE symptom, shortness of breath, she told her nurse and requested a CT scan and an IV heparin drip, all while gasping for air. She started to receive an ultrasound to look for DVT in the legs, prompting her to express dissatisfaction with the medical staff, who were not looking for clots where she had symptoms (her lungs), and they were not yet treating her presumed PE. After being diagnosed with PE and not DVT, and after receiving heparin IV, the coughing from the PE caused her C-section surgical site to open, and the heparin contributed to bleeding at the site. Serena later received an IVC filter while in the hospital.

Other notable people have been affected by DVT. Former United States President Richard Nixon had recurrent DVT, and so has former Secretary of State Hillary Clinton. She was first diagnosed while First Lady in 1998 and again in 2009. Dick Cheney was diagnosed with an episode while Vice President, and TV show host Regis Philbin had DVT after hip-replacement surgery. DVT has also contributed to the deaths of famous people. For example, DVT and PE played a role in rapper Heavy D's death at age 44. NBC journalist David Bloom died at age 39 while covering the Iraq War from a PE that was thought to have progressed from a missed DVT, and actor Jimmy Stewart had DVT that progressed to a PE when he was 89.

=== History ===
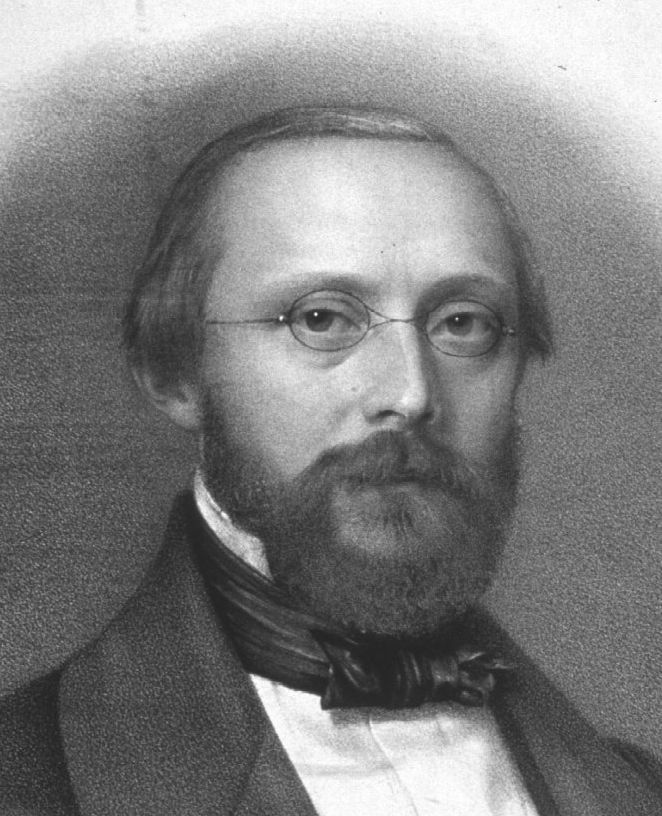
Rudolf Virchow

The book Sushruta Samhita, an Ayurvedic text published around 600–900 BC, contains what has been cited as the first description of DVT. In 1271, DVT symptoms in the leg of a 20-year-old male were described in a French manuscript, which has been cited as the first case or the first Western reference to DVT.

In 1856, German physician and pathologist Rudolf Virchow published his analysis after the insertion of foreign bodies into the jugular veins of dogs, which migrated to the pulmonary arteries. These foreign bodies caused pulmonary emboli, and Virchow was focused on explaining their consequences. He cited three factors, which are now understood as hypercoagulability, stasis, and endothelial injury. It was not until 1950 that this framework was cited as Virchow's triad, but the teaching of Virchow's triad has continued in light of its utility as a theoretical framework and as a recognition of the significant progress Virchow made in expanding the understanding of VTE.

Methods to observe DVT by ultrasound were established in the 1960s. Diagnoses were commonly performed by impedance plethysmography in the 1970s and 1980s, but ultrasound, particularly after the utility of probe compression was demonstrated in 1986, became the preferred diagnostic method. Yet, in the mid-1990s, contrast venography and impedance plethysmography were still described as common.

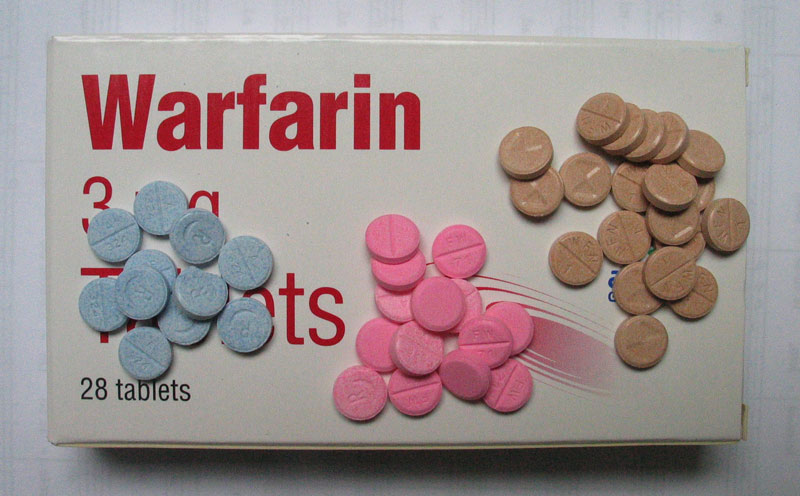
Warfarin, a common vitamin K antagonist, was the mainstay of pharmacological treatment for about 50 years.

Multiple pharmacological therapies for DVT were introduced in the 20th century: oral anticoagulants in the 1940s, subcutaneous injections of LDUH in 1962 and subcutaneous injections of LMWH in 1982. 1974 was when vascular inflammation and venous thrombosis were first proposed to be interrelated. For around 50 years, a months-long warfarin (Coumadin) regimen was the mainstay of pharmacological treatment. To avoid the blood monitoring required with warfarin and the injections required by heparin and heparin-like medicines, direct oral anticoagulants (DOACs) were developed. In the late 2000s to early 2010s, DOACs—including rivaroxaban (Xarelto), apixaban (Eliquis), and dabigatran (Pradaxa)—came to the market. The New York Times described a "furious battle" among the three makers of these drugs "for the prescription pads of doctors".

=== Economics ===
VTE costs the US healthcare system about $7 to 10 billion annually. Initial and average DVT costs for a hospitalized US patient is about $10,000 (2015 estimate). In Europe, the costs for an initial VTE hospitalization are significantly less, costing about €2000 to 4000 (2011 estimate). Post-thrombotic syndrome is a significant contributor to DVT follow-up costs. Outpatient treatment significantly reduces costs, and treatment costs for PE exceed those of DVT.

== Research directions ==
A 2019 study published in Nature Genetics reported more than doubling the known genetic loci associated with VTE. In their updated 2018 clinical practice guidelines, the American Society of Hematology identified 29 separate research priorities, most of which related to patients who are acutely or critically ill. Inhibition of factor XI, P-selectin, E-selectin, and a reduction in formation of neutrophil extracellular traps are potential therapies that might treat VTE without increasing bleeding risk.
