= White hand sign =

- Differential diagnosis: thoracic outlet syndrome

The white hand sign is a medical sign observed as a visible whitening of skin on the hand when the subject elevates the hands above the shoulder girdle with fingers pointing to the ceiling and palms facing forward. It results from this change in position causing a compression of the subclavian artery and temporary loss of circulation, as often occurs in patients with thoracic outlet syndrome, a complex syndrome involving the compression of various nerves and blood vessels between the axilla (armpit) and the base of the neck.

== See also ==
- Adson's sign
