= First rib resection =

Thoracic outlet syndrome treatment

- Specialty: Vascular surgeon

First rib resection is a surgical procedure used in humans to treat thoracic outlet syndrome (TOS) and Paget–Schroetter disease. It involves the surgical removal of a segment of the first rib, which is the rib closest to the head, under the collar bone.

== Indications ==
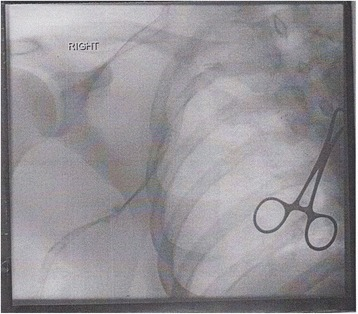
Venogram showing venous thoracic outlet syndrome. Thrombolysis is typically performed prior to first rib resection for venous thoracic outlet syndrome.

First rib resection is indicated for venous, arterial, and neurogenic TOS. In all cases, the goal of the operation is to increase the dynamic space between the chest wall and the clavicle, through which the subclavian vein, artery, and the brachial nerve roots pass.

== Procedure ==
The first rib may be approached several different ways: from above the clavicle in an inferior direction (infraclavicular), from above the clavicle (supraclavicular), from the posterior neck, and from the armpit medially (transaxillary).

While the operation universally involves removal of the first rib, depending on the indication for the operation, additional maneuvers may be performed. For venous thoracic outlet syndrome, removal of anterior scalene muscle (scalenectomy) and freeing up scar tissue around the subclavian vein (venolysis) are often also performed. If anomalous cervical ribs are present, these may be removed as well.
