= May–Thurner syndrome =

- Other names: Iliac vein compression syndrome
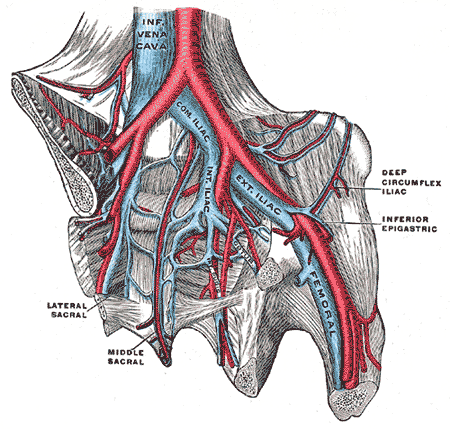
- Iliac veins
- Specialty: Vascular surgery

May–Thurner syndrome (MTS), also known as the iliac vein compression syndrome, is a condition in which compression of the common venous outflow tract of the left lower extremity may cause discomfort, swelling, pain or iliofemoral deep vein thrombosis.

Specifically, the problem is due to left common iliac vein compression by the overlying right common iliac artery. This leads to stasis of blood, which predisposes to the formation of blood clots. Uncommon variations of MTS have been described, such as the right common iliac vein getting compressed by the right common iliac artery.

In the twenty-first century, the May–Thurner syndrome definition has been expanded to a broader disease profile known as nonthrombotic iliac vein lesions (NIVL) which can involve both the right and left iliac veins as well as multiple other named venous segments. This syndrome frequently manifests as pain when the limb is dependent (hanging down the edge of a bed/chair) and/or significant swelling of the whole limb.

== Signs and symptoms ==
Because of its similarities to deep vein thrombosis (DVT), May–Thurner syndrome is rarely diagnosed amongst the general population. In this condition, the right iliac artery sequesters and compresses the left common iliac vein against the lumbar section of the spine, resulting in swelling of the legs and ankles, pain, tingling, and/or numbness in the legs and feet. The pain is often presented as dull, and may progress up and down the leg depending on the patient. Lower extremities may feel warm to the touch, and swelling may maintain or dissipate throughout the day. If left untreated, May-Thurner Syndrome can progress into different stages of disease.

Stage 1: Iliac Vein Compression – Some patients may or may not experience symptoms, formation of varicose veins may occur.

Stage 2: Venous Spur Formation – The vein can develop fibrous type shelves which cause the blood flow to be restricted, increasing the chance for a DVT to occur.

Stage 3: Deep Vein Thrombosis (DVT) – This happens when a blood clot is formed within the vein. The flow is restricted, leading to severe pain, and swelling in the legs.

== Mechanism ==
In contrast to the right common iliac vein, which ascends almost vertically to the inferior vena cava, the left common iliac vein traverses diagonally from left to right to enter the inferior vena cava. Along this course, it goes under the right common iliac artery, which may compress it against the lumbar spine and limit the flow of blood out of the left leg. There are case reports of the inferior vena cava being compressed by the iliac arteries or right-sided compression syndromes, but the vast majority are on the left side. While this is the suspected cause of the syndrome, the left iliac vein is frequently seen to be compressed in asymptomatic patients, and considered an anatomic variant. A 50% luminal compression of the left iliac vein occurs in a quarter of healthy individuals. Compression becomes clinically significant only if it causes appreciable hemodynamic changes in venous flow or venous pressure, or if it leads to acute or chronic deep vein thrombosis (DVT).

In addition to compression, the vein develops intraluminal fibrous spurs from the effects of the chronic pulsatile compressive force from the artery. The narrowed turbulent channel predisposes the patient to thrombosis. The compromised blood flow often causes collateral blood vessels to form. These are most often horizontal transpelvis collaterals, connecting both internal iliac veins, thus creating outflow through the right common iliac vein. Sometimes vertical collaterals are formed, most often paralumbar, which can cause neurological symptoms, like tingling and numbness.

This compressed, narrowed outflow channel causes stasis of the blood, which is one element of Virchow's triad that precipitates DVT.

== Diagnosis ==
It is important to consider May–Thurner syndrome in patients who have no other obvious reason for hypercoagulability and who present with left lower extremity thrombosis. To rule out other causes for hypercoagulation, it may be appropriate to check the antithrombin, protein C, protein S, factor V Leiden, prothrombin G20210A, and antiphospholipid antibodies.

Venography will demonstrate the classical syndrome when causing deep venous thrombosis.

May–Thurner syndrome in the broader disease profile, known as nonthrombotic iliac vein lesions (NIVLs), exists in the symptomatic ambulatory patient and these lesions are usually not seen by venography. Morphologically, intravascular ultrasound has emerged as the best current tool in the broader sense. Functional testing such as duplex ultrasound, venous and interstitial pressure measurement and plethysmography may sometimes be beneficial. Compression of the left common iliac vein may be seen on pelvic CT scan.

== Treatment ==
Management of the underlying defect is proportional to the severity of the clinical presentation. Leg swelling and pain is best evaluated by vascular specialists (vascular surgeons, interventional cardiologists, and interventional radiologists) who both diagnose and treat arterial and venous diseases to ensure that the cause of the extremity pain is evaluated. The diagnosis needs to be confirmed with some sort of imaging that may include magnetic resonance venography, venogram and usually confirmed with intravascular ultrasound because the flattened vein may not be noticed on conventional venography. In order to prevent prolonged swelling or pain from the consequences of the backed up blood from the compressed iliac vein, flow needs to be improved out of the leg. Uncomplicated cases may be managed with compression stockings.

Severe May–Thurner syndrome may require thrombolysis if there is a recent onset of thrombosis, followed by angioplasty and stenting of the iliac vein after confirming the diagnosis with a venogram or an intravascular ultrasound. A stent may be used to support the area from further compression following angioplasty. As the name implies, there classically is not a thrombotic component in these cases, but thrombosis may occur at any time.

If the patient has extensive thrombosis, it may be appropriate to consider pharmacologic and/or mechanical (also known as pharmacomechanical) thrombectomy. This is currently being studied to determine whether this will decrease the incidence of post-thrombotic syndrome.

== Epidemiology ==
May–Thurner syndrome is thought to represent between two and five percent of lower-extremity venous disorders. May–Thurner syndrome is often unrecognized. Current estimates are that this condition is three times more common in women than in men. The classic syndrome typically presents in the second to fourth decades of life. In the twenty-first century in a broader disease profile, the syndrome acts as a permissive lesion and becomes symptomatic when something else happens such as, following trauma, a change in functional status such as swelling following orthopaedic joint replacement.

== See also ==
- Thoracic outlet syndrome (TOS) – Compression of the brachial plexus or subclavian vessels.
- Paget–Schroetter disease – Upper extremity deep vein thrombosis in the axillary or subclavian veins, related to TOS.
- Budd–Chiari syndrome – Venous compression or obstruction in the liver.
- Nutcracker syndrome - Compression of the left renal vein between aorta and upper mesenteric artery.
