= Alfred Washington Adson =

American physician (1887–1951)

Alfred Washington Adson (March 13, 1887 – November 12, 1951) was an American physician, military officer, and surgeon. He was in medical practice with the Mayo Clinic and the Mayo Graduate School of Medicine of the University of Minnesota at Rochester, Minnesota. He was associated with the development of the Section of Neurological Surgery which was first established at Mayo in 1919. He functioned as its chair until 1946. He undertook pioneering neurosurgery and gave his name to a medical condition, a medical sign, a medical diagnostic manoeuvre, and medical instruments.

== Early life and education ==
Alfred Adson was born at Terril, Iowa. His parents Anna B. Adson (1869–1955) and Martin Adson (1864–1955) were both Norwegian immigrants. Adson attained his BSc in 1912 at the University of Nebraska, his M.D. in 1914 from the University of Pennsylvania and MA in 1918 from the University of Nebraska. As a fellow in surgery, he entered the Mayo Clinic in July 1914 where he was invited to develop a section of neurological surgery. He became a substantive member of staff on January 1, 1917.

== Career ==
He was a first lieutenant in the Medical Reserve Corps of the US Army in the First World War. After the war, he continued to be head of the Section of Neurological surgery at the Mayo Clinic until 1946 when he was appointed to senior consultant in the same section.

Adson undertook innovative neurosurgery for the treatment of glossopharyngeal neuralgia, Raynaud's Disease, Hirschsprung's disease and for essential hypertension.

He was a colonel in the US Army Medical Reserve Corps and a fellow of The American College of Surgeons and a member of the International Neurological Association, the Association for Research in Nervous and Mental Diseases Inc., the Society of Neurological Surgeons, the American Association of Neurological Surgeons, the Western Surgical Association, the Central Neuropsychiatric Association and the Minnesota Society of Neurology and Psychiatry.

He received in 1948 an honorary degree of Doctor of Science from the University of Nebraska and one from St Olaf College, Northfield, Minnesota.

He was president of the Society of Neurological Surgeons in 1932 and 1933, of the Minnesota State Medical Association in 1937, the Minnesota State Board of Medical Examiners in 1938 and 1943, the Minnesota Neurological Society in 1941, and of the North Central Medical Conference in 1948.

== Personal life ==
He married Lora G. Smith on 3, August 1911. They had three children: William W. Adson, Mary L. Adson and Martin Adson, head of a section of surgery in the Mayo Clinic.

== Selected works ==
- Surgical Consideration of Brain Tumors (1934)
- The Surgical Management of Brain Abscess (1935)
- The Treatment of Cranial Osteomyelitis and Brain Abscess (1938)

== Eponymous attributes ==
- Adson-Coffey syndrome. Named by Adson and Jay R Coffey, also called thoracic outlet syndrome, a condition which involves pressure on the nerve bundle that leaves the thoracic cavity in the region of the armpit.
- Adson manoeuvre: used to elicit Adson's sign. A loss of the radial pulse on the side affected by TOS when the patient fills their lungs and turns their head with stretched neck, to the affected side.
- Adson-Graeff forceps: 125mm-long tissue forceps.
- Beckman-Adson retractor: used for holding open surgical incisions.
- Adson dissecting forceps: used for holding fine tissue.
