= Pectoralis minor syndrome =

Peripheral nervous system disorder

Pectoralis minor syndrome (PMS) is a condition related to thoracic outlet syndrome (TOS) that results from the pectoralis minor muscle being too tight. PMS results from the brachial plexus being compressed under the pectoralis minor while TOS involves compression of the bundle above the clavicle. In most patients, the nerves are constricted resulting in neurogenic PMS, but venous compression (venous PMS) can also occur.

PMS and TOS often, but not always, occur together. They share similar symptoms including tingling, pain, or weakness in the hand and arm, but in PMS there is also pain or tenderness in the chest wall where the pectoralis minor attaches to the scapula as well as in the armpit. One study of 100 patients diagnosed with neurogenic TOS found that 75 percent also had neurogenic PMS and 30 percent in fact had PMS without TOS.

PMS is often caused by injury to the neck, excessive stretching of the shoulder, or certain sports that involve overhead throwing. Confirmation of the diagnosis can be done by blocking the pectoralis minor muscle or injecting botulinium. First-line treatment for patients with PMS but without TOS is self-stretching of the pectoralis minor muscle. Other treatments include injection of botulinium, or surgery that cuts the pectoralis minor tendon.

For patients with PMS but without TOS, one study found that surgery resulted in a good or excellent outcome in 90 percent of cases. Another study in ten patients with PMS substantially resolved symptoms in all but one case.

PMS was first described in 1945.
