= Military brace =

Posture

The military brace is a body posture, sometimes known as scapular posterior depression or the costoclavicular maneuver. It is a modification of standing at attention that is primarily used in military schools. It is also used in the diagnosis of costoclavicular syndrome and thoracic outlet syndrome.

The position is described as first standing in a relaxed posture, with the head looking forward, then depressing and retracting the shoulders as if standing at attention, extending the humerus and abducting it 30 degrees, and hyperextending the neck and head. A more informal description is to lie down on the floor on one's back and try to touch the floor with the back of one's neck, which will force one's chin down; and then to attempt to imitate that position whilst standing up or sitting.

In addition to this, at The Citadel and The Virginia Military Institute, the arms are to be tucked in to the side of one's body, eliminating any space between the arms and the torso, and the shoulders are to be thrust back, with the shoulder blades as close to touching in the center of the back as possible.

Military brace has caused Erb's palsy in some military school cadets.
