= Intermittent pneumatic compression =

Therapeutic technique

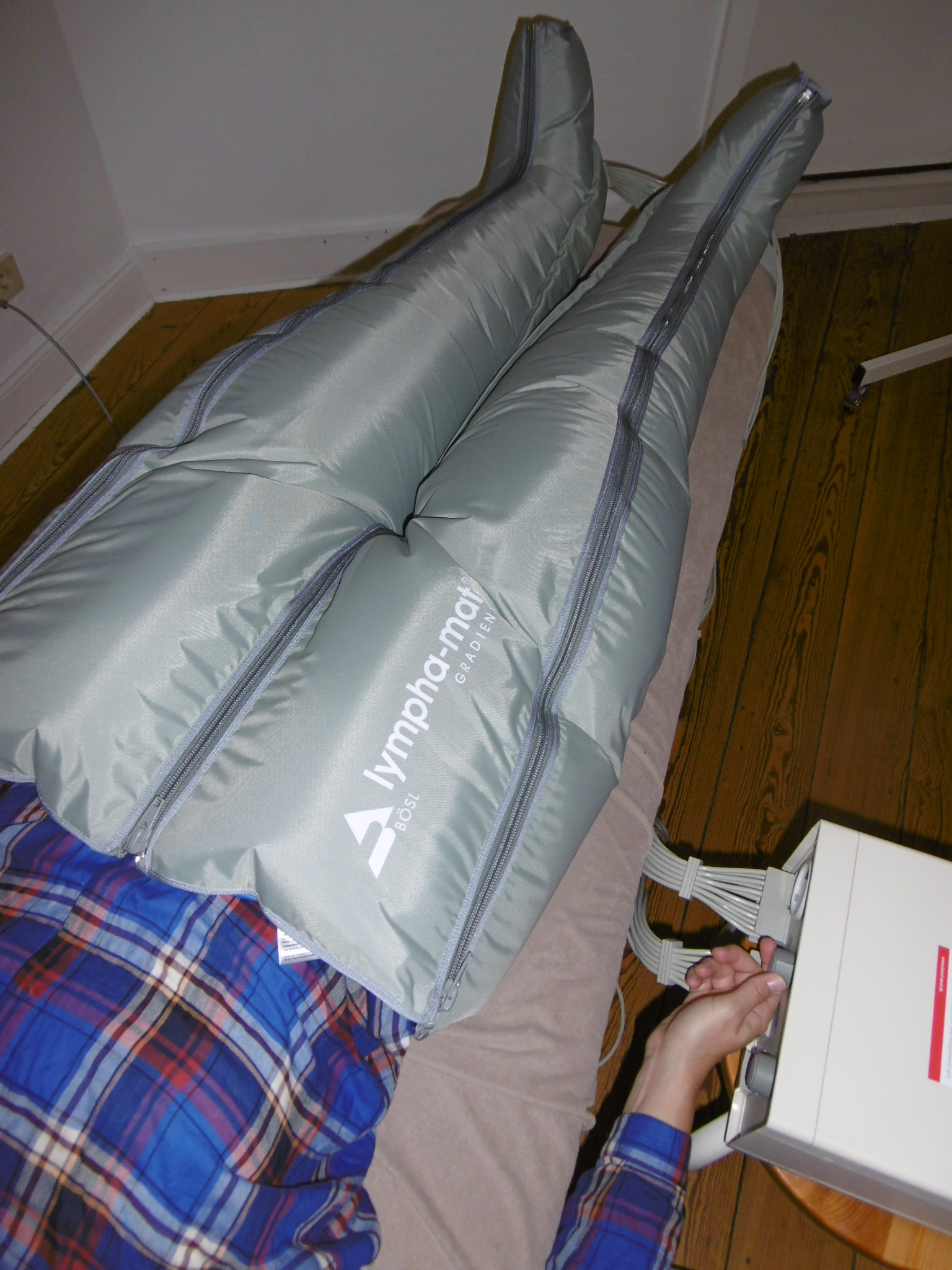
IPK with inflatable trousers

Intermittent pneumatic compression is a therapeutic technique used in medical devices that include an air pump and inflatable auxiliary sleeves, gloves or boots in a system designed to improve venous circulation in the limbs of patients who have edema or the risk of deep vein thrombosis (DVT), pulmonary embolism (PE), or the combination of DVT and PE, venous thromboembolism (VTE).

In use, an inflatable jacket (sleeve, glove, trousers or boot) encloses the limb requiring treatment, and pressure lines are connected between the jacket and the air pump. When activated, the pump fills the air chambers of the jacket in order to pressurize the tissues in the limb, thereby forcing fluids, such as blood and lymph, out of the pressurized area. A short time later, the pressure is reduced, allowing increased blood flow back into the limb.

The primary functional aim of the device "is to squeeze blood from the underlying deep veins, which, assuming that the valves [in those veins] are competent, will be displaced proximally." When the inflatable sleeves deflate, the veins will replenish with blood. The intermittent compressions of the sleeves will ensure the movement of venous blood.

== Sequential compression devices ==
Sequential compression devices (SCD) utilize sleeves with separated areas or pockets of inflation, which works to squeeze on the appendage in a "milking action." The most distal areas will initially inflate, and the subsequent pockets will follow in the same manner.

Sequential calf compression and graduated compression stockings are currently the preferred prophylaxis in neurosurgery for the prevention of DVT and pulmonary embolism, sometimes in combination with low molecular weight heparins or unfractionated heparin.

Intraoperative SCD-therapy is recommended during prolonged laparoscopic surgery to counter altered venous blood return from the lower extremities and consequent cardiac depression caused by pneumoperitoneum (inflation of the abdomen with carbon dioxide).

== Patient falls ==
Some clinicians are hesitant to prescribe SCD therapy because of a perceived increased risk for patient falls. A 2011 review of 3,562 hospital falls identified 16 associated with SCD therapy and measured the impacts of each fall. It concluded that SCD "is rarely associated with in-hospital patient falls, and SCD-related falls are not more harmful than other types of falls."
