= Tinho (footballer, born 1992) =

Santomean footballer (born 1992)

Personal information
- Full name: Adérito Pires da Mata
- Date of birth: 8 September 1992 (age 34)
- Place of birth: São Tomé, São Tomé and Príncipe
- Position: Midfielder

Team information
- Current team: Porto Real

Senior career*
Years	Team	Apps	(Gls)
2017–2019	Praia Cruz		
2019–	Porto Real		

International career^{‡}
2017–	São Tomé and Príncipe	5	(0)
- * Club domestic league appearances and goals as of 00:11, 26 March 2021 (UTC) ‡ National team caps and goals as of 00:11, 26 March 2021 (UTC)

Adérito Pires da Mata (born 8 September 1992), known as Tinho, is a Santomean professional footballer who plays as a midfielder for Porto Real and the São Tomé and Príncipe national team.

== International career ==
Tinho made his professional debut with the São Tomé and Príncipe national team in a 2–0 2018 African Nations Championship qualification loss to Cameroon on 12 August 2017.
