= Tinho (footballer, born 1982) =

Brazilian footballer

Personal information
- Full name: Adson Alves da Silva
- Date of birth: November 24, 1982 (age 43)
- Place of birth: Juazeiro, Brazil
- Height: 1.73 m (5 ft 8 in)
- Position: Striker

Team information
- Current team: Oulu

Youth career
- 2002: Juazeiro-BA

Senior career*
Years	Team	Apps	(Gls)
2003	Juazeiro-BA		
2004	Náutico		
2005	União Barbarense		
2006	Itabaiana		
2006–2007	Sport		
2007–2008	Gondomar (loan)	8	(1)
2008	Grêmio Juventus (loan)		
2009	Itabaiana		
2009	Sergipe		
2009	Oulu (trail)		
- * Club domestic league appearances and goals as of 28 May 2008

Adson Alves da Silva or simply Tinho (born 24 November 1982 in Juazeiro), is a Brazilian striker. He currently plays for Oulu.

He was loaned to Gondomar at Liga de Honra 2007–08 season.

== Honours ==
- Pernambuco State League: 2004, 2007
