= Paget–Schroetter disease =

Formation of blood clots in the deep veins of the arms

Paget–Schrotter disease
- Other names: Paget–von Schrötter disease
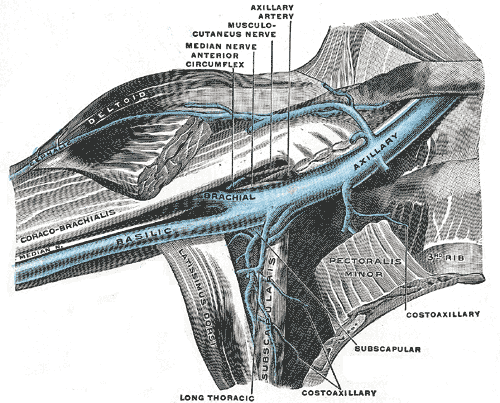
- Anterior view of right upper limb and thorax
- Specialty: Vascular surgery
- Named after: James Paget; Leopold von Schrötter

Paget–Schroetter disease (which evolved from a venous thoracic outlet syndrome) is a form of upper extremity deep vein thrombosis (DVT), a medical condition in which blood clots form in the deep veins of the arms. These DVTs typically occur in the axillary and/or subclavian veins.

== Signs and symptoms ==
The condition is relatively rare. It usually presents in young and otherwise healthy patients, and also occurs more often in males than females. The syndrome also became known as "effort-induced thrombosis" in the 1960s, as it has been reported to occur after vigorous activity, though it can also occur due to anatomic abnormality such as clavicle impingement or spontaneously. It may develop as a sequela of thoracic outlet syndrome. It is differentiated from secondary causes of upper extremity thrombosis caused by intravascular catheters. Paget–Schroetter syndrome was described once for a viola player who suddenly increased practice time 10-fold, creating enough repetitive pressure against the brachiocephalic and external jugular veins to cause thrombosis.

Symptoms may include sudden onset of pain, warmth, redness, blueness and swelling in the arm. Diagnosis is usually confirmed with an ultrasound. These DVTs have the potential to cause a pulmonary embolism.

== Diagnosis ==
Duplex ultrasonography MR Venography

== Prevention ==
Prevention of Paget–Schroetter disease can be accomplished by gradual increases in activity and by avoiding strenuous upper extremity activity.

== Treatment ==
The traditional treatment for thrombosis is the same as for a lower extremity DVT, and involves systemic anticoagulation to prevent a pulmonary embolus. Some have also recommended thrombolysis with catheter-directed alteplase or mechanical thrombectomy with a large-bore catheter and manual aspiration providing definitive intervention with an endovascular approach. If there is thoracic outlet syndrome or other anatomical cause then surgery can be considered to correct the underlying defect.

== History ==
The condition is named after two men. James Paget first proposed the idea of venous thrombosis causing upper extremity pain and swelling, and Leopold von Schrötter later linked the clinical syndrome to thrombosis of the axillary and subclavian veins.
