= Adson's sign =

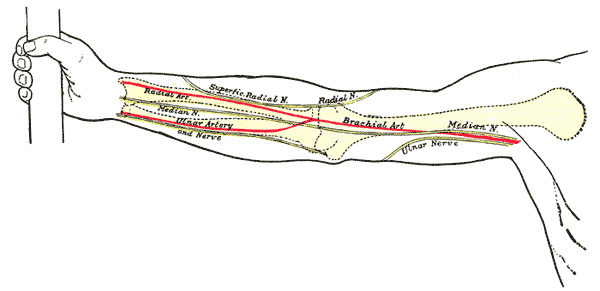
- Front of right upper extremity
- Differential diagnosis: thoracic outlet syndrome

Adson's sign is the loss of the radial pulse in the arm by rotating head to the ipsilateral side with extended neck following deep inspiration.

It is sometimes used as a sign of thoracic outlet syndrome (TOS). It is named after Alfred Washington Adson.

== Limitations, and pathophysiology of thoracic outlet syndrome ==
Adson's sign is no longer used as a positive diagnosis of TOS since many people without TOS will show a positive Adson's.

There is minimal evidence of interexaminer reliability.

Thoracic outlet obstruction may be caused by a number of abnormalities, including degenerative or bony disorders, trauma to the cervical spine, fibromuscular bands, vascular abnormalities, and spasm of the anterior scalene muscle. Symptoms are due to compression of the brachial plexus and subclavian vasculature, and consist of complaints ranging from diffuse arm pain to a sensation of arm fatigue, frequently aggravated by carrying anything in the ipsilateral hand or doing overhead work such as window cleaning.

== Process ==
- The patient is placed in a sitting position, hands resting on thighs.
- The examiner palpates radial pulse on side being tested
- Patient actively rotates head to ipsilateral side being tested while the examiner laterally rotates and extends the patient's shoulder
- Patient takes a deep breath and is instructed to hold it

The test is positive if radicular symptoms are reported and secondary to a diminished or loss of the radial pulse.

== See also ==
- White hand sign
