= Thoracic outlet syndrome =

Compression of nerves or blood vessels between the neck and ribcage

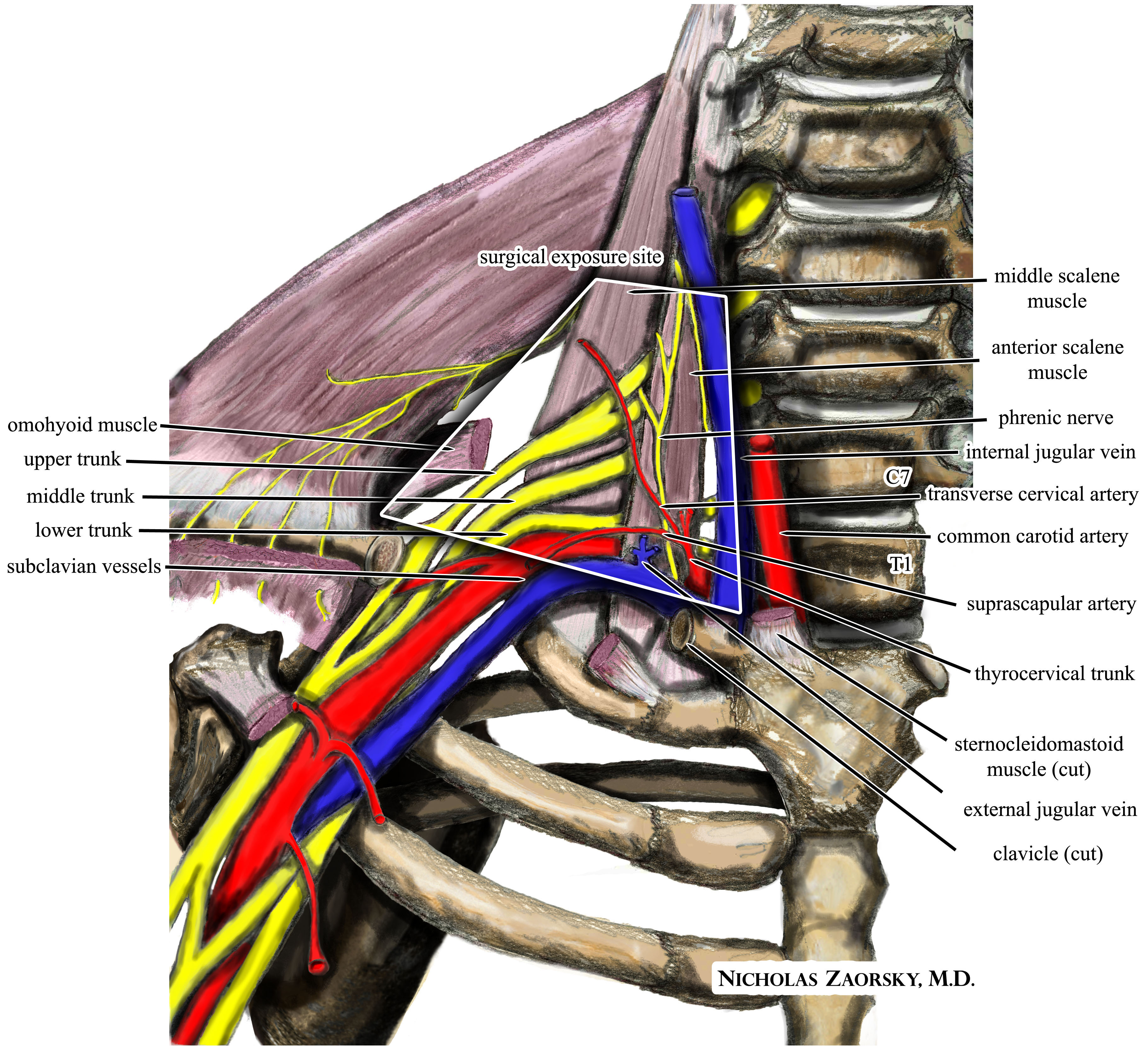
- The right brachial plexus, viewed from in front.
- Specialty: Vascular surgery, thoracic surgery
- Symptoms: Pain, weakness, loss of muscle at the base of the thumb, swelling, paleness, bluish coloration
- Usual onset: 20 to 50 years of age
- Types: Neurogenic, venous, arterial
- Causes: Compression of the nerves, arteries, or veins in the superior thoracic aperture (thoracic outlet), the passageway from the lower neck to the armpit
- Risk factors: Trauma, repetitive arm movements, tumors, pregnancy, cervical rib
- Diagnostic method: Nerve conduction studies, medical imaging
- Differential diagnosis: Carpal Tunnel Syndrome (wrist), Rotator cuff tear, cervical disc disorders, fibromyalgia, multiple sclerosis, complex regional pain syndrome, pectoralis minor syndrome
- Treatment: Pain medication, surgery
- Frequency: ~1%

Thoracic outlet syndrome (TOS) is a condition in which there is compression of the nerves, arteries, or veins in the superior thoracic aperture, the passageway from the lower neck to the armpit, also known as the thoracic outlet. There are three main types: neurogenic, venous, and arterial. The neurogenic type is the most common and presents with pain, weakness, paraesthesia, and occasionally loss of muscle at the base of the thumb. The venous type results in swelling, pain, and possibly a bluish coloration of the arm. The arterial type results in pain, coldness, and pallor of the arm.

TOS may result from trauma, repetitive arm movements, tumors, pregnancy, or anatomical variations such as a cervical rib. The diagnosis may be supported by nerve conduction studies and medical imaging. TOS is difficult to diagnose and there are many potential differential diagnoses as well as other diseases that are often co-occurrent with TOS.

Initial treatment for the neurogenic type is with exercises to strengthen the chest muscles and improve posture. NSAIDs such as naproxen may be used for pain. Surgery is typically done for the arterial and venous types and a decompression for the neurogenic type if it does not improve with other treatments. Blood thinners may be used to treat or prevent blood clots. Due in part to inconsistent definitions and diagnostic criteria among TOS research, the true incidence of TOS is unknown; estimates have ranged from as low as a handful per 100,000 to around 1% of the population. It is more common in women than men and it occurs most commonly between 20 and 50 years of age. The condition was first described in 1818 and the current term "thoracic outlet syndrome" first used in 1956.

== Signs and symptoms ==
TOS affects mainly the upper limbs, with signs and symptoms manifesting in the shoulders, neck, arms and hands. Pain can be present on an intermittent or permanent basis. It can be sharp/stabbing, burning, or aching. TOS can involve only part of the hand (as in the pinky and adjacent half of the ring finger), all of the hand, or the inner aspect of the forearm and upper arm. Pain can also be in the side of the neck, the pectoral area below the clavicle, the armpit/axillary area, and the upper back (i.e., the trapezius and rhomboid area). Discoloration of the hands, one hand colder than the other hand, weakness of the hand and arm muscles, and tingling are commonly present.

Only 1% of people with carpal tunnel syndrome have concomitant TOS.

Repetitive motions can cause enlargement of muscles which causes compression of veins. Besides, overuse injury of the upper limbs causes swellings, small bleeding, and subsequent fibrosis which would cause the thrombosis of the subclavian vein, leading to Paget–Schroetter disease or effort-induced thrombosis.

Pemberton's sign is a clinical sign elicited by having the patient hold their arms above their head for 1 minute. The development of facial plethora, cyanosis, inspiratory stridor and non-pulsatile elevation of the JVP is indicative of TOS.

TOS can be related to cerebrovascular arterial insufficiency when affecting the subclavian artery. It also can affect the vertebral artery, in which case it could produce vision disturbances, including transient blindness, and embolic cerebral infarction.

TOS can also lead to eye problems and vision loss as a circumstance of vertebral artery compression. Although very rare, if compression of the brain stem is also involved in an individual presentation of TOS, transient blindness may occur while the head is held in certain positions. If left untreated, TOS can lead to neurological deficits as a result of the hypoperfusion and hypometabolism of certain areas of the brain and cerebellum.

TOS has similar symptoms to pectoralis minor syndrome (PMS), which usually results from compression of the brachial plexus beneath the pectoralis minor muscle (while neurogenic TOS is caused by compression of the same nerves above the clavicle). Unlike TOS there are typically few headaches or neck pain in patients with PMS only, instead there is pain in the chest area. Initially, it was believed that 95 percent of patients with TOS had nerve compression in the scalene area, but in the twenty-first century it is now recognized that the majority have nerve compression under the pectoralis minor, either by itself or in addition to the scalene area. One study of 100 patients diagnosed with neurogenic TOS found that 75 percent had neurogenic PMS and 30 percent in fact had PMS without TOS.

== Causes ==
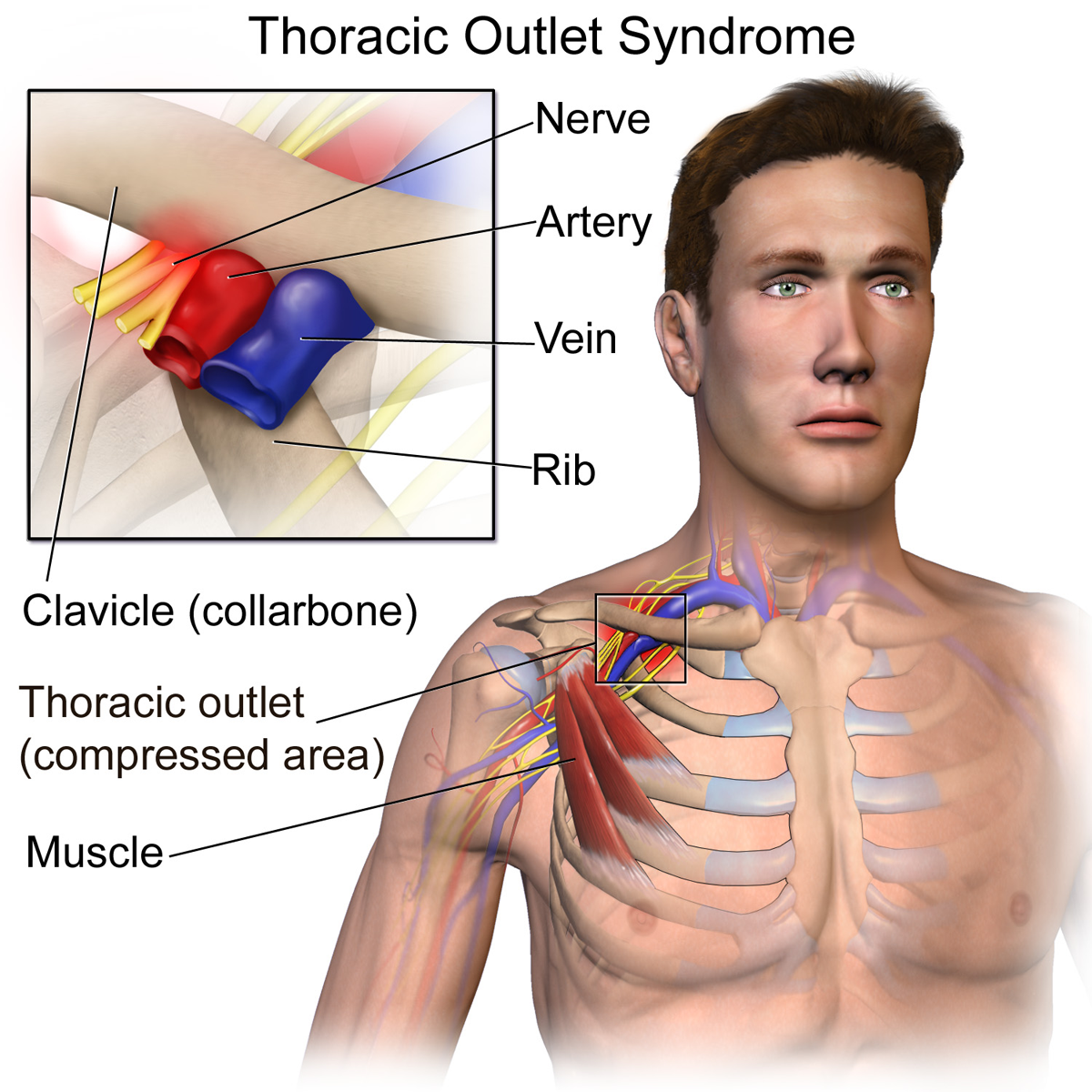
Thoracic outlet syndrome

TOS can be attributed to one or more of the following factors:

- Congenital abnormalities are frequently found in persons with TOS. Bone abnormalities include the presence of a cervical rib and a prolonged transverse process. Soft tissue abnormalities include scalene muscle hypertrophy, the presence of a fourth scalene muscle (scalenus minimus), or connective tissue abnormalities.
- Trauma (e.g., whiplash injuries) or repetitive strain is frequently implicated.
- Injury, such as first rib fracture or clavicle fracture.
- Rarer acquired causes include tumors (especially pancoast tumor), hyperostosis, and osteomyelitis.

Up to 15% of neurogenic TOS cases are idiopathic.

== Diagnosis ==
Historically, TOS has been difficult to diagnose, and has been considered a diagnosis of exclusion. However, recent efforts have been made to define TOS and formalize diagnostic criteria in an attempt to make TOS research consistent. The criteria for the three types of TOS—neurogenic, venous, and arterial—differ; for example, a diagnosis of venous or arterial TOS requires medical imaging, while neurogenic TOS does not, though such imaging is useful in excluding conditions that share similar symptoms. In rare cases when doctors find objective findings of nerve compression not attributable to another condition, it is called "true" neurogenic TOS. However, when there is no specified pathological evidence, it is called "disputed" neurogenic TOS. The value of this clinical distinction has also been challenged in recent years.

Several provocative tests have seen use in clinical examinations. For neurogenic TOS, common tests include the elevated arm stress test (EAST), also called the Roos stress test, and the upper limb tension test (ULTT). These tests have high sensitivity but low specificity, meaning their main value is in potentially excluding neurogenic TOS as a diagnosis, but testing positive should raise suspicions that neurogenic TOS may be present. Adson's sign and the costoclavicular maneuver lack specificity and sensitivity and should make up only a small part of the mandatory comprehensive history and physical examination undertaken with a patient suspected of having TOS.

Additional maneuvers that may be abnormal in TOS include Wright's test, which involves hyperabducting the arms over the head with some extension and evaluating for loss of radial pulses or signs of blanching of the skin in the hands indicating a decrease in blood flow with the maneuver. The "compression test" is also used, exerting pressure between the clavicle and medial humeral head causes radiation of pain and/or numbness into the affected arm.

Doppler arteriography, with probes at the fingertips and arms, tests the force and "smoothness" of the blood flow through the radial arteries, with and without having the patient perform various arm maneuvers (which causes compression of the subclavian artery at the thoracic outlet). The movements can elicit symptoms of pain and numbness and produce graphs with diminished arterial blood flow to the fingertips, providing strong evidence of impingement of the subclavian artery at the thoracic outlet. Doppler arteriography does not utilize probes at the fingertips and arms, and in this case is likely being confused with plethysmography, which is a different method that utilizes ultrasound without direct visualization of the affected vessels. Doppler ultrasound (not really 'arteriography') would not be used at the radial artery in order to make the diagnosis of TOS. Finally, even if a Doppler study of the appropriate artery were to be positive, it would not diagnose neurogenic TOS, by far the most common subtype of TOS. There is plenty of evidence in the medical literature to show that arterial compression does not equate to brachial plexus compression, although they may occur together, in varying degrees. Additionally, arterial compression by itself does not make the diagnosis of arterial TOS (the rarest form of TOS). Lesser degrees of arterial compression have been shown in normal individuals in various arm positions and are thought to be of little significance without the other criteria for arterial TOS.

MRI scan can show the anatomy of the thoracic outlet, the soft tissues causing compression, and can show directly the brachial plexus compression.

It has been reported by advanced physiotherapist Rob Patterson that the UK lags behind the US on obtaining a diagnosis for the condition.

=== Classification ===
==== By structures affected and symptomatology ====
There are three main types of TOS, named according to the cause of the symptoms; however, these three classifications have been coming into disfavor because TOS can involve all three types of compression to various degrees. The compression can occur in three anatomical structures (arteries, veins and nerves), it can be isolated, or, more commonly, two or three of the structures are compressed to greater or lesser degrees. In addition, the compressive forces can be of different magnitude in each affected structure. Therefore, symptoms can be variable.

- Neurogenic TOS includes disorders produced by compression of components of the brachial plexus nerves. The neurogenic form of TOS accounts for anywhere from 80 to 95% of all cases of TOS.
- Venous TOS is due to compression of the subclavian vein. This makes up about 4 to 20% of cases.
- Arterial TOS is due to compression of the subclavian artery. This is less than one percent of cases. However, this type maybe mistakenly provided as a diagnosis when the patient may actually have NTOS. This is due to misconceptions regarding loss of pulse and compression with arm elevation without any signs of damage, a clot or an aneurysm to the artery.

==== By event ====
There are many causes of TOS. The most frequent cause is trauma, either sudden (as in a clavicle fracture caused by a car accident), or repetitive (as in a legal secretary who works with his/her hands, wrists, and arms at a fast-paced desk station with non-ergonomic posture for many years). TOS is also found in certain occupations involving much lifting of the arms and repetitive use of the wrists and arms. In some cases, repetitive upper-extremity activity can lead to a specific subtype of venous TOS known as Paget–Schroetter syndrome, which involves thrombosis of the subclavian vein and typically occurs in otherwise young and healthy individuals.

One cause of arterial compression is trauma, and a recent case involving fracture of the clavicle has been reported.

The two groups of people most likely to develop TOS are those with neck injuries due to traffic accidents and those who use computers in non-ergonomic postures for extended periods of time. TOS is frequently a repetitive stress injury (RSI) caused by certain types of work environments.

==== By structure causing constriction ====
It is also possible to classify TOS by the location of the obstruction:

- Anterior scalene syndrome (compression on brachial plexus and/or subclavian artery caused by muscle growth).
- Cervical rib syndrome (compression on brachial plexus and/or subclavian artery caused by bone growth).
- Costoclavicular syndrome (narrowing between the clavicle and the first rib) – diagnosed with the costoclavicular maneuver.

Some people are born with an extra incomplete and very small rib above their first rib, which protrudes out into the superior thoracic outlet space. This rudimentary rib causes fibrous changes around the brachial plexus nerves, inducing compression and causing the symptoms and signs of TOS. This is called a "cervical rib" because of its attachment to C-7 (the seventh cervical vertebra), and its surgical removal is almost always recommended. The symptoms of TOS can first appear in the early teen years as a child is becoming more athletic.

== Treatment ==
Evidence for the treatment of thoracic outlet syndrome as of 2014 is poor.

=== Physical measures ===
Stretching, occupational and physical therapy are common non-invasive approaches used in the treatment of TOS. The goal of stretching is to relieve compression in the thoracic cavity, reduce blood vessel and nerve impingement, and realign the bones, muscles, ligaments, or tendons that are causing the problem.

- One commonly prescribed set of stretches includes moving the shoulders anteriorly (forward – called "hunching"), then back to a neutral position, then extending them posteriorly (backward, called "arching"), then back to neutral, followed by lifting the shoulders up as high as possible, and then back down to neutral, repeated in cycles as tolerated.
- Another set of stretches involves tilting and extending the neck opposite to the side of the injury while keeping the injured arm down or wrapped around the back.
- Occupational or Physical therapy can include passive or active range of motion exercises, working up to weighted or restricted sets (as tolerated).

TOS is rapidly aggravated by poor posture. Active breathing exercises and ergonomic desk setup and motion practices can help maintain active posture. Often the muscles in the back become weak due to prolonged (years of) "hunching" and other poor postures.

Ice can be used to decrease inflammation of sore or injured muscles. Heat can also aid in relieving sore muscles by improving blood circulation to them. While the whole arm generally feels painful in TOS, some relief can be seen when ice or heat is intermittently applied to the thoracic region (collar bone, armpit, or shoulder blades).

=== Medications ===
In a review, botox was compared to a placebo injected into the scalene muscles. No effect in terms of pain relief or improved movement was noted. However, in a six-months follow-up, paresthesia (abnormal sensations such as in pins and needles) was seen to be significantly improved.

=== Surgery ===
Surgical approaches have also been used successfully in TOS. Microsurgery can be used approaching the area from above the collar bone (supraclavicular) followed by neurolysis of the brachial plexus, removal of part or all of the anterior scalene muscle, and the release of the underlying (subclavicular) blood vessels. This approach avoids the use of resection, and has been found to be an effective treatment. In cases where the first rib (or a fibrous band extending from the first rib) is compressing a vein, artery, or the nerve bundle, part of the first rib and any compressive fibrous tissue, can be removed in a first rib resection and thoracic outlet decompression surgical procedure; scalene muscles may also need to be removed (scalenectomy). This allows increased blood flow and the reduction of nerve compression. In some cases there may be a rudimentary rib or a cervical rib that can be causing the compression, which can be removed using the same technique.

Physical therapy is often used before and after the operation to improve recovery time and outcomes. Potential complications include pneumothorax, infection, loss of sensation, motor problems, subclavian vessel damage, and, as in all surgeries, a very small risk of permanent serious injury or death.

== Cases ==
=== Sports ===
Several Major League Baseball players, especially pitchers, have been diagnosed with thoracic outlet syndrome, including Robert Stock, Stephen Strasburg, Chris Archer, Matt Harvey, Chris Carpenter, Jaime Garcia, Shaun Marcum, Matt Harrison, Clayton Richard, Nate Karns, Noah Lowry, and Zack Wheeler. Starting pitcher Chris Young, who previously struggled with shoulder problems, underwent surgery for TOS in 2013 and felt "completely different" post-recovery. Young exceeded expectations on his return to the major leagues at age 35, becoming a valuable member of the 2014 Seattle Mariners' starting rotation. In July 1980, Houston Astros starting pitcher J.R. Richard collapsed while playing a game of catch, and was found to have experienced a stroke due to severe blockage of his right carotid artery. Given the fact that shortly beforehand, he had been found to have near-total obstruction of the arteries supplying his right arm, he was eventually diagnosed with extensive arterial thoracic outlet syndrome. Although he attempted a comeback, his professional baseball career was effectively ended.

NHL defenseman Adam McQuaid was diagnosed with TOS in September 2012, and as a result was nominated for the Bill Masterton Memorial Trophy. Forward Chris Kreider was diagnosed with a malformed rib in 2017. Kreider dealt with multiple symptoms prior to the diagnosis, such as shortness of breath on the ice, swelling/numbness in his right arm, coughing up blood and a blood clot in his right arm. Kreider underwent successful surgery to resect a rib in January 2018 (the same surgery as TOS) and has performed well since returning to the Rangers.

NBA guard Markelle Fultz was diagnosed with TOS in December 2018, which is considered to be the reason Fultz could not perform in the NBA as he did in college.

UFC fighter Matt Serra had a rib removed to alleviate TOS.

British rock-climber and 2024 Olympic gold-medalist Toby Roberts was diagnosed with TOS in late 2025.

=== Music ===
Musician Isaac Hanson had a pulmonary embolism as a consequence of thoracic outlet syndrome.

The Japanese band Maria disbanded in 2010 due to drummer Tattsu's TOS which made it impossible for her to continue playing.

In 2015, singer Tamar Braxton had to leave Dancing With The Stars due to TOS.

== See also ==
- Pectoralis minor syndrome
- May–Thurner syndrome – a similar compressive pathology involving the left common iliac vein
- Backpack palsy – a similar compressive pathology involving the long thoracic nerve, or adjacent brachial plexus nerves
- nerve compression syndrome
- nerve decompression
