= Aureolysin =

Extracellular metalloprotease expressed by S. aureus

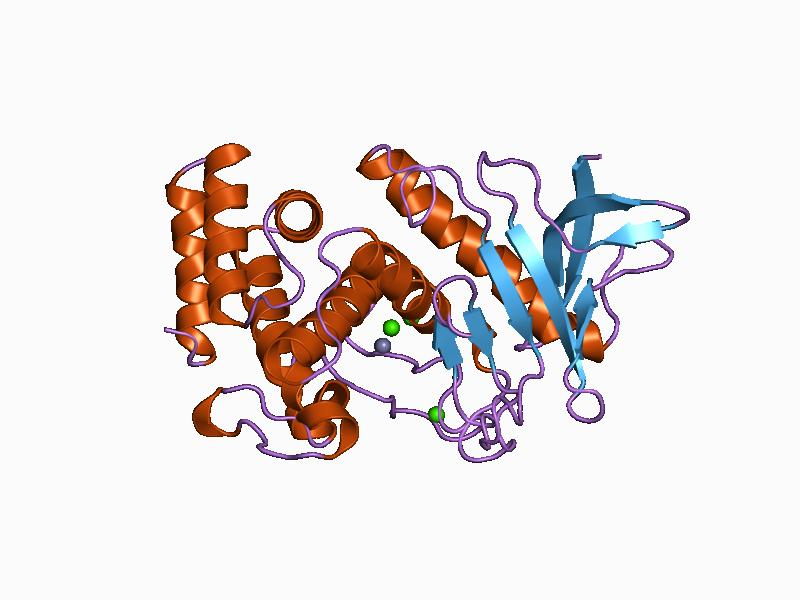

Identifiers
- EC no.: 3.4.24.29
- CAS no.: 39335-13-2

Databases
- IntEnz: IntEnz view
- BRENDA: BRENDA entry
- ExPASy: NiceZyme view
- KEGG: KEGG entry
- MetaCyc: metabolic pathway
- PRIAM: profile
- PDB structures: RCSB PDB PDBe PDBsum
Search
- PMC: articles
- PubMed: articles
- NCBI: proteins

Aureolysin (EC 3.4.24.29, protease III, staphylococcal metalloprotease, Staphylococcus aureus neutral proteinase) is an extracellular metalloprotease expressed by Staphylococcus aureus. This protease is a major contributor to the bacterium's virulence, or ability to cause disease, by cleaving host factors of the innate immune system as well as regulating S. aureus secreted toxins and cell wall proteins. To catalyze its enzymatic activities, aureolysin requires zinc and calcium which it obtains from the extracellular environment within the host.

== Genetics ==
Aureolysin is expressed from the gene aur, which is located on a monocistronic operon. The gene exists in two allelic forms but the sequence is highly conserved with 89% homology between the two. The gene contains a coding sequence of 1,527 nucleotides that translates into a pre-pro-form of the enzyme that is 509 amino acids long. Of the 509 amino acids, only 301 denote the mature form of aureolysin. After translation, the pre-portion of the enzyme is a 27 amino acid N-terminal signal peptide that acts as a guide to the secretion system located within the cell wall. Here, the signal peptide is cleaved upon secretion of aureolysin.

Aureolysin is largely co-expressed with other major proteases of S. aureus including the two cystine proteases, Staphopain A (ScpA) and B (SspB), and a serine protease V8 (SspA). The transcriptional regulation of aur is controlled by "housekeeping" sigma factor σ^{A}, and is up-regulated by accessory gene regulator agr. Expression levels of aureolysin are at their highest during the post-exponential phase however, up-regulation of aureolysin during phagocytosis has also been observed. Transcription is repressed by staphylococcal accessory regulator sarA and by alternative sigma factor σ^{B} (a stress response modulator of Gram-positive bacteria).

The aur gene has a high prevalence in the genome of both commensal- and pathogenic-type S. aureus strains.

== Activation ==
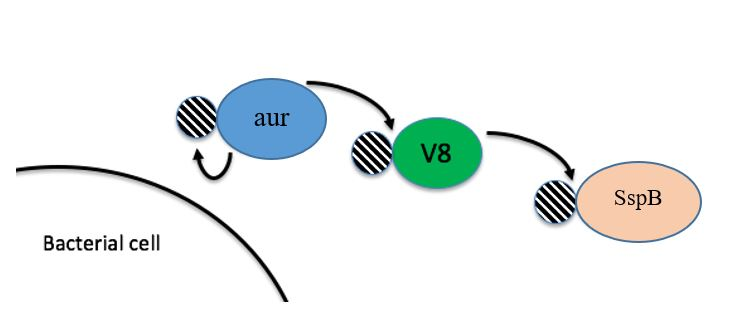
The staphylococcal proteolytic cascade. Once aureolysin, V8, and SspB are secreted into the extracellular environment, the pro-peptides, as indicated by the stripped smaller circles, need to be cleaved to generate enzyme activity. Aureolysin undergoes autocatalysis to remove the pro-peptide then cleaves V8, generating mature protease. V8 then activates SspB and the cascade is complete.

Aureolysin, along with V8, SspB, and ScpA, are all secreted a zymogens. This means that they are secreted in an inactive conformation until the propeptide is removed in some manner. Aureolysin, V8, and SspB constitute what is known as the staphylococcal proteolytic cascade. All three of these proteases are secreted into the environment with the propeptide inhibiting their activation. Aureolysin undergoes autocatalysis and the propeptide is degraded generating the mature form of the enzyme. Mature aureolysin will then cleave the propeptide from V8, causing this protease to become active. Finally V8 will cleave SspB propeptide and the cascade is now complete. ScpA becomes mature by autocatalytic degradation of the propeptide, similar to that of aureolysin.

The active residues of aureolysin are of critical importance to its enzymatic function. The active residue is a glutamate amino acid located at the 145th position of the protein.

== Immune Evasion ==
Aureolysin cleaves various immune components and host proteins. It is important for hiding the bacterium from the immune system and is responsible for mediating the transition of a biofilm forming phenotype to a mobile and invasive one. There are many different targets of aureolysin and the effect on each is critical for the bacterium's virulence.

One major way aureolysin contributes to infection, is by inactivating certain targets within the complement system. Of all the proteases, aureolysin is the most effective against the complement cascade. In all three pathways of complement activation, there is a target for the protease to manipulate. In the classical pathway, aureolysin not only decreases deposition of C1q on the S. aureus bacterial surface, it induces C1q to bind surfaces and deposit on commensal bacteria surfaces that typically do not activate the innate immune system. Aureolysin has also been noted to produce high levels of C5a in human plasma, which leads to overstimulation of neutrophils that ultimately results in neutrophil death. C3 is another major target of aureolysin. The active site has a high affinity for C3 and will cleave it into C3a and C3b however, the protein is cleaved two amino acid residues away from the native site that is recognized by the host C3 convertase. The aureolysin derived C3a and C3b are further degraded by host complement inhibitor factor H and I. In the lectin pathway, aureolysin inhibits MBL and ficolin binding which, in turn, reduce C3b deposition.

Further immune evasion outside of the complement system occurs in various ways. Aureolysin cleaves and inactivates protease inhibitor α_{1}-antichymotrypsin and partially inactivates α_{1}-antitrypsin. The cleavage of α_{1}-antitrypsin generates a fragment chemotactic to neutrophils, and the cleavage of both protease inhibitors causes deregulation of neutrophil-derived proteolytic activity. Aureolysin has also been shown to cleave the antimicrobial peptide LL-37, rendering it inactive and unable to puncture the bacterial cell wall. Production of immunoglobulin by lymphocytes is inhibited by aureolysin as well. It contributes to both coagulation triggered by coagulase, and to fibrinolysis mediated by staphylokinase. Proteolytic conversion of pro-thrombin into thrombin by aureolysin works synergistically with coagulase and contributes to the staphylocoagulation of human plasma. By inducing staphylocoagulation, the bacterium is hidden within the clot from phagocytic cells. Contradictory to staphylocoagulation, aureolysin is responsible for the activation of urokinase, and inactivation of α_{2}-antiplasmin and plasminogen activator inhibitor-1. This promotes the dissemination of the bacterium to allow for further invasion of the host.

== Biological significance ==
When S. aureus is establishing an infection within a host, it needs to continuously switch from a static, or biofilm forming phenotype, to an invasive, or mobile phenotype. The proteases help mediate this process. Aureolysin appears to down-regulate the formation of biofilms and allow for the mobility of the bacterium. One way it contributes to this change is by mediating coagulation as well as the activation of urokinase. However, it also mediates S. aureus cell wall and secreted proteins to promote this change. For example, clumping factor B is a surface protein that is responsible for the binding of fibrinogen around the bacterium to hide it within a clot. Aureolysin is responsible for the cleavage of clumping factor B, which causes the loss of S. aureus binding to fibrinogen. By this mechanism, it may act as a self-regulatory mechanism for dissemination and spreading in combination with activation of fibrinolysis, while the protease simultaneously provides protection against complement activation. It has been demonstrated that aureolysin has impact for bacterial survival in human whole blood. Aureolysin is also up-regulated upon phagocytosis and promotes intracellular survival.

S. aureus prefers to establish a chronic, or long lasting infection within a host. While promoting dissemination and counteracting immune mechanisms, aureolysin also regulates secreted virulence factors to control the pathogenicity of the bacterium. By inactivation of PSMs and α-toxins, aureolysin may suppress the pathogenic impact of the bacteria allowing for a chronic infection to be established.
