= Hyperfibrinolysis =

The fibrinolysis system is responsible for removing blood clots. Hyperfibrinolysis describes a situation with markedly enhanced fibrinolytic activity, resulting in increased, sometimes catastrophic bleeding. Hyperfibrinolysis can be caused by acquired or congenital reasons. Among the congenital conditions for hyperfibrinolysis, alpha-2-plasmin inhibitor deficiency or plasminogen activator inhibitor type 1 (PAI-1) are very rare. The affected individuals show a hemophilia-like bleeding phenotype. Acquired hyperfibrinolysis is found in liver disease, in patients with severe trauma, during major surgical procedures, and other conditions. A special situation with temporarily enhanced fibrinolysis is thrombolytic therapy with drugs which activate plasminogen, e.g. for use in acute ischemic events or in patients with stroke. In patients with severe trauma, hyperfibrinolysis is associated with poor outcome. Moreover, hyperfibrinolysis may be associated with blood brain barrier impairment, a plasmin-dependent effect due to an increased generation of bradykinin.

Bleeding is caused by the generation of fibrinogen degradation products which interfere with regular fibrin polymerization and inhibit platelet aggregation. Moreover, plasmin which is formed in excess in hyperfibrinolysis can proteolytically activate or inactivate many plasmatic or cellular proteins involved in hemostasis. Especially the degradation of fibrinogen, an essential protein for platelet aggregation and clot stability, may be a major cause for clinical bleeding.

== Diagnosis ==
The diagnosis of hyperfibrinolysis is made indirectly with immunochemical methods which detect the elevation of biomarkers such as D-Dimer (cross-linked fibrin degradation products), fibrinogen split products (FSP), complexes of plasmin and alpha-2-antiplasmin (PAP). However, the sensitivity and specificity of these methods is limited because elevation of these biomarkers can also occur induced in other clinical conditions. The classical coagulation tests such as PT (prothrombin time), aPTT (activated partial thromboplastin time) or thrombin time are not very sensitive for hyperfibrinolysis, and influenced by numerous other variables. The euglobulin lysis time test is very time-consuming and complex. Viscoelastic methods in whole blood, especially thromboelastometry (TEM) when performed with special reagents detect hyperfibrinolysis very sensitively in a functional approach. The APTEM test, a tissue factor activated, heparin insensitive test performed in the presence of aprotinin (fibrinolysis inhibitor, confirms hyperfibrinolysis by comparing the TEM result of this assay with the EXTEM test (same activator, but without aprotinin). A normalization or improvement of the TEMogram in APTEM versus EXTEM confirms hyperfibrinolysis. This in vitro approach can predict to a certain level if normal clot formation can be restored by use of an antifibrinolytic drug.

== Treatment ==
Since the use of aprotinin has been abandoned due to major side effects, the treatment or prophylaxis of hyperfibrinolysis is made with synthetic drugs such as tranexamic acid, epsilon-aminocaproic acid or other lysine analogues. When used appropriately, antifibriolytic drugs may avoid unnecessary transfusions.
