= FA2 =

FA2 or variant, may refer to:

- Harrier FA2, VTOL fighter airplane
- Fulton FA-2 Airphibian, car-airplane hybrid
- ALCO FA-2 locomotive
- Osella FA2 racecar
- Casio FA-2 programmable calculator interface
- Fresh Aire II, 1977 Mannheim Steamroller album
- (12315) 1992 FA2, an asteroid
- 1985 FA2, the asteroid 3713 Pieters
- 1993 FA2, the asteroid 10806 Mexico
- Fruit bromelain FA2, an enzyme

== See also ==
- 2AF, the Second Air Force
- AF-2 (disambiguation)
