= Streptomyces megasporus =

Scientific classification
- Domain: Bacteria
- Kingdom: Bacillati
- Phylum: Actinomycetota
- Class: Actinomycetes
- Order: Streptomycetales
- Family: Streptomycetaceae
- Genus: Streptomyces
- Species: S. megasporus

Binomial name
- Streptomyces megasporus (ex Krassilnikov et al. 1968) Agre 1986

Type strain
- ATCC 43688, DSM 41450, DSM 41476, GoodfellowK45, HUT-6610, IFO 14749, INA M-22, INMI 1869, INMI 2869, JCM 6306, JCM 6926, LaceyA1202, NBRC 14749, NCIMB 12472, NRRL B-16372, VKM Ac-1776

Synonyms
- Actinomyces megasporus Krassilnikov et al. 1968

Species of bacterium

Streptomyces megasporus is a thermophilic bacterium species from the genus of Streptomyces. The strain SD5 of Streptomyces megasporus produces fibrinolytic enzymes.

== See also ==
- List of Streptomyces species
