= Thromboelastography =

Blood coagulation test

- MeSH: D013916
- LOINC: 67790-6. Io

Thromboelastography (TEG) is a method of testing the efficiency of blood coagulation. It is a test mainly used in surgery and anesthesiology, although increasingly used in resuscitations in emergency departments, intensive care units, and labor and delivery suites. More common tests of blood coagulation include prothrombin time (PT) and partial thromboplastin time (aPTT) which measure coagulation factor function, but TEG also can assess platelet function, clot strength, and fibrinolysis which these other tests cannot.

Thromboelastometry (TEM), previously named rotational thromboelastography (ROTEG) or rotational thromboelastometry (ROTEM), is another version of TEG in which it is the sensor shaft, rather than the cup, that rotates.

== Mechanics ==
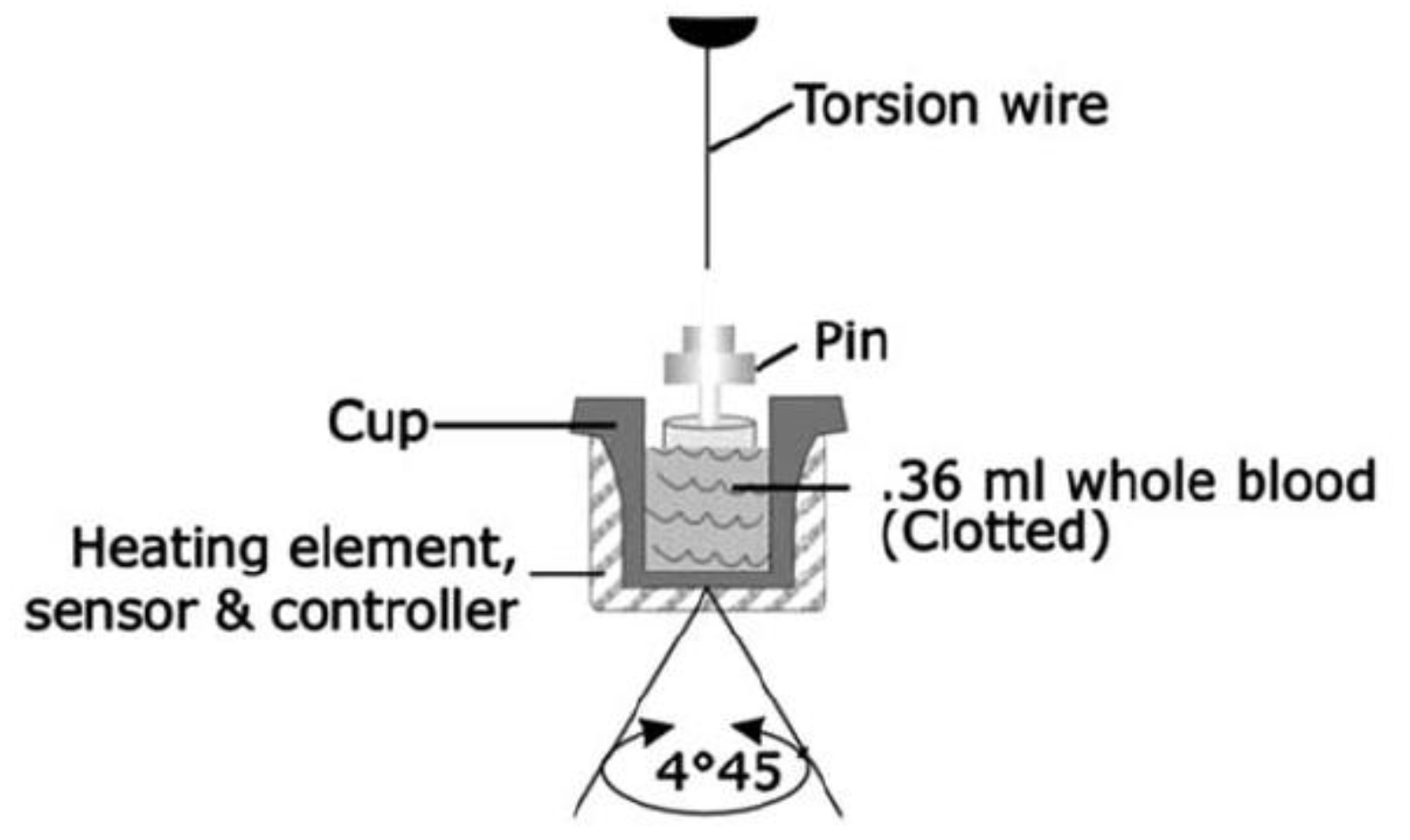
Thromboelastography mechanics.

A small sample of blood is taken from the selected person and rotated gently through 4º 45', six times a minute, to imitate sluggish venous flow and activate coagulation. The clot forms around a thin wire probe used for measurement. The speed and strength of clot formation is measured in various ways, typically by computer. The speed at which the sample coagulates depends on the activity of the plasma coagulation system, platelet function, fibrinolysis and other factors which can be affected by genetics, illness, environment, and medications. The patterns of changes in strength and elasticity in the clot provide information about how well the blood can perform hemostasis and how well or poorly different factors are contributing to clot formation.

Four values that represent clot formation are determined by this test: the reaction time (R value), the K value, the angle and the maximum amplitude (MA). The R value represents the time until the first evidence of a clot is detected. The K value is the time from the end of R until the clot reaches 20mm and this represents the speed of clot formation. The angle is the tangent of the curve made as the K is reached and offers similar information to K. The MA is a reflection of clot strength. A mathematical formula determined by the manufacturer can be used to determine a Coagulation Index (CI) (or overall assessment of coagulability) which takes into account the relative contribution of each of these 4 values into 1 equation. The G-value is a log-derivation of the MA and is meant to also represent the clot strength using dynes/sec as its units. There are some studies which suggest that an elevated G-value is associated with a hypercoagulable state and therefore increases the risk for venous thromboembolic disease. However, there are no studies dosing of prophylactic heparin products based on the G-value. TEG also measures clot lysis which is reported as both the estimated percent lysis (EPL) and the percentage of clot which has actually lysed after 30 minutes (LY 30,%). Although a normal EPL can be as high as 15% and a normal LY 30 can be as high as 8%, some studies in the trauma population suggest that a LY30 greater than 3% is associated with risk of hemorrhage.

Thromboelastometry (TEM), previously named rotational thromboelastography (ROTEG) or rotational thromboelastometry (ROTEM), is another version of TEG in which it is the sensor shaft, rather than the cup, that rotates. Blood (300 μL, anticoagulated with citrate) is placed into the disposable cuvette using an electronic pipette. A disposable pin is attached to a shaft which is connected with a thin spring (the equivalent to Hartert's torsion wire in thrombelastography) and slowly oscillates back and forth. The signal of the pin suspended in the blood sample is transmitted via an optical detector system. The test is started by adding appropriate reagents. The instrument measures and graphically displays the changes in elasticity at all stages of the developing and resolving clot. The typical test temperature is 37 °C, but different temperatures can be selected, e.g. for patients with hypothermia.

== Parameters ==
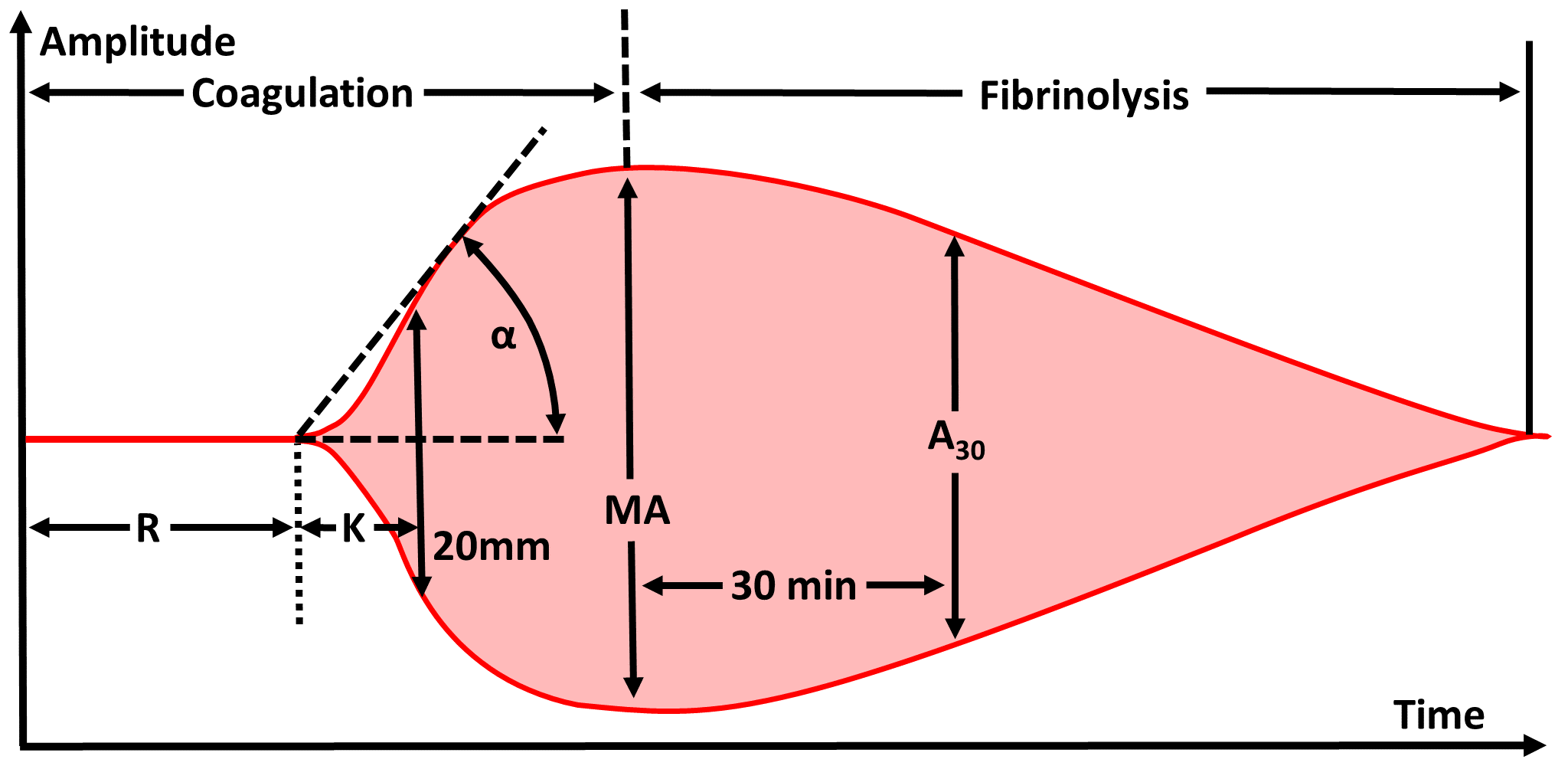
Normal thromboelastogram with parameters.

Parameters derived from thromboelastography are mainly:

- R time: Time to initial clot formation (that is, amplitude deviation from baseline)
- K time: Time from initial clot formation until reaching 20 mm in amplitude
- Alpha angle (α): Angle between the baseline at initial clot formation, and a tangent line that intersects the tracing curve.
- Maximum amplitude (MA): Maximum deviation of tracing to baseline.
- A_{30}: Amplitude 30 minutes after reaching maximum amplitude.

== Interpretation ==
Following are examples of thromboelastography patterns and recommended treatments.

Condition	Appearance	Main treatment
Normal		
Hemodilution or clotting factor deficiency		Fresh frozen plasma
Fibrinogen deficiency		Cryoprecipitate
Low or dysfunctional platelets		Platelets
Thrombosis		Anticoagulant
Primary fibrinolysis		Antifibrinolytics or tranexamic acid
Secondary fibrinolysis		Treating disseminated intravascular coagulation

== Assay types ==
There are several types of assays that can be run using TEG: Standard (kaolin), RapidTEG, heparinase, Functional Fibrinogen and PlateletMapping. A standard TEG is the most commonly ordered test and includes the parameters noted above. A RapidTEG uses tissue factor in addition to kaolin thereby further speeding up the reaction. In this assay, the R-value is replaced by the TEG-ACT value which is measured in seconds rather than in minutes. The remainder of the TEG parameters do not differ between a standard and RapidTEG. A heparinase TEG is used to assess for heparin-associated anticoagulation as the cause of hemorrhage. It is used most commonly following cardiopulmonary bypass procedures where heparin is reversed using protamine intraoperatively. In instances where a patient develops bleeding due to recurrent coagulopathy (usually shortly after arrival to the ICU), the heparinase TEG can help quickly discern patients who can be treated with additional dosing of protamine versus those who need to be taken back to the operating room for re-exploration. In this assay, a standard TEG is run twice – once using the patient's blood only and another time using the patient's blood plus added heparinase. If the two graphs are nearly the same, the cause of bleeding is not related to heparin rebound. However, if the R-time associated with the heparinase-added specimen is significantly shorter than the R-time of the patient's blood without added heparinase, the bleeding is likely due to heparin rebound and should respond to administration of protamine. Lastly, the platelet map TEG aims to determine to what degree platelet function may be inhibited due to pharmacologic inhibition of either the arachidonic acid (AA) or adenosine diphosphate (ADP) pathways. Aspirin inhibits platelet function via the AA pathway while clopidogrel inhibits platelet function via the ADP pathway; thus, this test can be used to determine the degree to which a patient is anticoagulated due to either medication. In this assay, a standard TEG is run using patient's whole blood. Then, separate assays are run using the patient's blood with added AA or ADP. The contribution of fibrin to the MA is subtracted using a mathematical formula. This allows determination of the MA (AA) and MA (ADP), respectively. The difference between the patient's whole blood result and AA/ADP added results are used to calculate the percent inhibition.

== Use in treatment ==
Because the R value on the TEG represents the time it takes for clot formation to start, it is a reflection of coagulation factor activity. Coagulation factors are essentially enzymes that drive clot formation. Thus, a significantly prolonged R time could be treated with frozen plasma. The alpha angle represents the thrombin burst and conversion of fibrinogen to fibrin. Thus, a depressed alpha angle could be treated with cryoprecipitate. 80% of the MA is derived from platelet function whereas the remaining 20% is derived from fibrin. Thus, a significantly depressed MA could be treated with platelet transfusion or medications that improve platelet function, such as DDAVP. An elevated EPL or LY30 suggests fibrinolysis and may be treated with an antifibrinolytic, such as tranexamic acid or aminocaproic acid, in the appropriate clinical setting. A single, modified TEG assay with exogenous tissue plasminogen activator (tPA) demonstrated remarkable efficiency in unmasking patients' impending risk for massive transfusion in trauma patients. The iTACTIC trial showed no difference in outcomes in trauma patients with massive hemorrhage managed with conventional coagulation tests compared to viscoelastic assays. However, the traumatic brain injury subgroup showed slightly better survival in the TEG/ROTEM group with a "very low" quality assessment by the GRADE system.

Clinical studies of thromboelastography during elective surgery (cardiac and liver surgery) and emergency resuscitation have shown improvements in clinical outcomes. In elective surgery there was a decreased need for blood products (platelets and plasma) and reduced operating room length of stay as well as duration of intensive care admission and bleeding rates; mortality was not affected. In emergency settings, mortality was reduced with an associated decrease in the need for platelets and plasma.

Additional studies show thromboelastography may be used to characterize COVID-19-associated coagulopathy. TEG with platelet mapping may be used to guide use of anticoagulant and antiplatelet medications. When using a TEG-guided strategy hospital length of stay, intensive care unit length of stay, mortality, acute kidney injury, intensive care unit admissions and need for mechanical ventilation may be reduced.

The TEG test has some limitations. Multiple daily calibrations are required for accurate readings. For this, trained lab personnel are required. Once testing begins, partial results can be available within minutes however, entire results may take much longer. The TEG test does not reflect the interactions between a patient’s blood and their endothelial cell surface, which is important in vivo. Additionally, TEG is insensitive to many therapeutic anti-platelet drug effects.
