= Wobenzym =

Enzyme mixture

Wobenzym, a combination of proteolytic enzymes and the antioxidant rutin, works systemically by targeting various tissues and organs in the body. Wobenzym is targeted at modulating the immune response to restore a healthy balance between anti-inflammatory and pro-inflammatory cytokines. Some possible side effects have been reported in medical literature.

Wobenzym was first developed in the 1950s by Austrian physician Max Wolf, and is today marketed by Nestlé Health Science.

In clinical studies, oral administration of proteolytic enzymes to healthy volunteers resulted in immunomodulatory effects and systemic therapy before and after exhaustive exercise increased maximal concentric strength, and had favorable effects on inflammatory, metabolic and immune biomarkers. In a randomized trial of subjects with moderate-to-severe knee osteoarthritis, oral proteolytic enzymes were found to have comparable effectiveness as diclofenac in relieving pain and increasing function.

== See also ==
- Nieper therapy
- Proteases (medical and related uses)
