= Alpha-2-plasmin inhibitor deficiency =

Coagulopathy leading to increased risk of bleeding

Alpha-2-plasmin inhibitor deficiency, also known as alpha-2-antiplasmin deficiency or congenital alpha-2-antiplasmin deficiency, is a rare autosomal recessive coagulopathy characterized by impaired inhibition of plasmin, leading to increased fibrinolysis and a heightened risk of bleeding.

== Genetics ==
Alpha-2-plasmin inhibitor deficiency is caused by mutations in the SERPINF2 gene, which encodes the alpha-2-plasmin inhibitor (Alpha 2-antiplasmin) protein. The condition is inherited in an autosomal recessive manner, meaning that an individual must inherit two defective copies of the gene, one from each parent, to develop the disorder.

== Pathophysiology ==
The pathophysiology of alpha-2-plasmin inhibitor deficiency is intricately linked to the crucial role that alpha-2-plasmin inhibitor plays in regulating fibrinolysis. This serine protease inhibitor, also known as a serpin, is primarily responsible for inactivating plasmin, the key enzyme involved in breaking down fibrin clots. In normal physiological conditions, alpha 2-antiplasmin acts as a regulatory brake on the fibrinolytic system, ensuring that blood clots are not prematurely dissolved. In individuals with alpha-2-plasmin inhibitor deficiency, the absence or significant reduction of functional α2-antiplasmin leads to a dysregulation of the fibrinolytic process. Without this inhibitory protein, plasmin activity goes largely unchecked, resulting in an accelerated and excessive breakdown of fibrin clots. This means that even as the body forms necessary blood clots in response to injury or during normal hemostasis, these clots are rapidly and precipitously dissolved.

Despite the significant impact on fibrinolysis, alpha-2-plasmin inhibitor deficiency does not affect the initial stages of blood coagulation. Standard coagulation tests such as prothrombin time (PT) and activated partial prothrombin time (aPTT) typically remain within normal ranges. Furthermore, the condition does not lead to a systemic lytic state or disseminated intravascular coagulation, distinguishing it from other disorders that might cause widespread clotting abnormalities.

== Symptoms ==
One of the hallmark symptoms is a tendency for prolonged bleeding following minor trauma or injury. Patients often report experiencing delayed oozing from wound sites, which can persist long after the initial injury has occurred. This delayed bleeding is a result of the premature dissolution of blood clots due to uninhibited plasmin activity. Spontaneous bleeding episodes are another significant concern. These episodes can manifest in various ways, including recurrent epistaxis and gum bleeding. Some patients may experience more severe spontaneous hemorrhages, which can occur in atypical locations such as the diaphysis of long bones. Patients with congenital deficiency of alpha 2-antiplasmin may present with a severe hemorrhagic disorders.

== Diagnosis ==
Diagnosis of alpha-2-plasmin inhibitor deficiency involves clinical evaluation of bleeding symptoms and family history assessment. Laboratory tests include a functional α2-antiplasmin assay (levels below 10% in homozygous individuals), genetic testing for mutations in the SERPINF2 gene and normal results for standard coagulation tests (PT, aPTT). Clinical assays for Alpha 2-antiplasmin levels are not widely available, and many patients are identified during comprehensive hematologic evaluations for unexplained delayed bleeding episodes.

== Treatment ==
The treatment of alpha-2-plasmin inhibitor deficiency primarily focuses on managing bleeding episodes and preventing complications. Antifibrinolytic therapy is the cornerstone of treatment, with aminocaproic acid or tranexamic acid being the most commonly used medications. These drugs help stabilize blood clots by inhibiting plasmin formation and activity, thereby compensating for the lack of alpha-2-plasmin inhibitor.

For patients experiencing severe bleeding episodes or those undergoing surgical procedures, fresh frozen plasma (FFP) transfusion is recommended as a source of exogenous alpha-2-plasmin inhibitor. This temporary supplementation can help restore normal fibrinolytic balance and reduce bleeding risk.

In some cases, additional supportive measures may be necessary. For instance, vitamin K supplementation has been reported to improve the condition of some patients, although the mechanism of action in this context is not fully understood.

== Epidemiology ==
Alpha-2-plasmin inhibitor deficiency is extremely rare, with fewer than 20 cases of homozygous deficiency reported worldwide as of the most comprehensive review. The true prevalence may be underestimated due to diagnostic challenges and potential misdiagnosis.
