= Fibrinolysin =

Clinical data
- AHFS/Drugs.com: International Drug Names
- Pregnancy category: C
- Routes of administration: ointment for local application, in combination with deoxyribonuclease
- ATC code: B01AD05 (WHO)

Legal status
- Legal status: Rx only (where available)

Pharmacokinetic data
- Bioavailability: virtually none
- Metabolism: local inactivation
- Elimination half-life: almost completely inactivated after 24 hours

Identifiers
- CAS Number: 9004-09-5
- DrugBank: DB08977
- ChemSpider: none
- UNII: A4028U842W
- ChEMBL: ChEMBL1201505
- ECHA InfoCard: 100.029.661

Chemical and physical data
- Molar mass: ~ 13,800 g/mol

Fibrinolysin is an enzyme derived from plasma of bovine origin (plasmin) or extracted from cultures of certain bacteria. It is used locally only and exclusively together with the enzyme desoxyribonuclease (extracted from bovine pancreas). Fibrinolysin and desoxyribonuclease both act as lytic enzymes. The combination is available as ointment containing 1 BU (Biological Unit) fibrinolysin and 666 BUs desoxyribonuclease per gram.

Fibrinolysin attacks and inactivates fibrin molecules occurring in undesirable exudates on the surface of the human body and on human mucosa, e.g., in superficial wounds and burns, while desoxyribonuclease targets and destroys (human) DNA. The combination of the two enzymes has a synergistic effect on necrotic but not on living tissue. According to the manufacturer the ointment provides enhanced wound cleaning and accelerates the healing process.

Both enzymes are marginally resorbed into systemic circulation because of their very high molecular weight and their macromolecular structure.

The activity of both enzymes is almost completely exhausted after 24 hours. Usually, it is necessary to repeat the application (and renew the dressing) every 6 to 8 hours until healing becomes complete.

The ointment is marketed by Pfizer under the brand name Fibrolan in a variety of countries (e.g. Switzerland). It is currently not approved in the USA.

Where approved, Fibrolan has been licensed on the basis of claimed good therapeutical experience, but adequate and well controlled studies are still lacking.

In the past, combinations with the antibiotic chloramphenicol were available, but because chloramphenicol in any form of application has led to aplastic anemia and death, these were banned. Additionally, combinations with the antifibrinolytic agent tranexamic acid have been withdrawn from pharmaceutic markets.

== Indications ==
Enzymatic wound cleaning to assist healing of minor burns, superficial wounds, ulcus cruris, and superficial hematoma.

== Contraindications and precautions ==
The ointment should not be used in patients with a known hypersensitivity to any ingredient. It should be used with caution in patients with hypersensitivity to bovine proteins in general and in pregnant women (category C), because no human data is available.

== Side-effects ==
Infrequently, local reactions such as increased pain or a stitching/burning sensation are noticed. No systemic anticoagulant activity has been seen due to the exclusively local character of treatment.

== Interactions ==
Not known.

== See also ==
- Staphylokinase (staphylococcal fibrinolysin)
