= ATG4D =

Protein-coding gene in the species Homo sapiens

Identifiers
- Aliases: ATG4D, APG4-D, APG4D, AUTL4, autophagy related 4D cysteine peptidase, HsAPG4D
- External IDs: OMIM: 611340; MGI: 2444308; GeneCards: ATG4D

Gene location (Human)
| Chr. | Chromosome 19 (human) |
| Band | 19p13.2 | Start | 10,543,895 bp |
| Band | 19p13.2 | End | 10,553,418 bp |

Gene location (Mouse)
| Chr. | Chromosome 9 (mouse) |
| Band | 9|9 A3 | Start | 21,176,589 bp |
| Band | 9|9 A3 | End | 21,189,068 bp |
RNA expression pattern
| Bgee | Human / Mouse (ortholog); Top expressed in: mucosa of transverse colon; left testis; apex of heart; right testis; muscle of thigh; duodenum; gastrocnemius muscle; left ventricle; granulocyte; skeletal muscle tissue / Top expressed in: granulocyte; lumbar spinal ganglion; right kidney; muscle of thigh; lip; temporal muscle; fetal liver hematopoietic progenitor cell; duodenum; digastric muscle; triceps brachii muscle; More reference expression data |
| BioGPS | n/a |
Gene ontology
| Molecular function | peptidase activity; cysteine-type peptidase activity; hydrolase activity; cysteine-type endopeptidase activity |
| Cellular component | cytoplasm; cytosol; mitochondrial matrix; mitochondrion |
| Biological process | autophagy; protein transport; autophagy of nucleus; C-terminal protein lipidation; protein delipidation; autophagy of mitochondrion; autophagosome assembly; proteolysis; protein targeting to membrane; apoptotic process |
Sources:Amigo / QuickGO
Orthologs
| Databases | NCBI: entry; OMA: entry |
| Species | Human | Mouse |
| Entrez | 84971 | 235040 |
| Ensembl | ENSG00000130734 | ENSMUSG00000002820 |
| UniProt | Q86TL0 | Q8BGV9 |
| RefSeq (mRNA) | NM_001281504; NM_032885 | NM_153583 |
| RefSeq (protein) | NP_001268433; NP_116274 | NP_705811 |
| Location (UCSC) | Chr 19: 10.54 – 10.55 Mb | Chr 9: 21.18 – 21.19 Mb |
| PubMed search |
- Wikidata
| View/Edit Human | View/Edit Mouse |

The human ATG4D gene encodes the protein Autophagy related 4D, cysteine peptidase.

== Function ==
Autophagy is the process by which endogenous proteins and damaged organelles are destroyed intracellularly. Autophagy is postulated to be essential for cell homeostasis and cell remodeling during differentiation, metamorphosis, non-apoptotic cell death, and aging. Reduced levels of autophagy have been described in some malignant tumors, and a role for autophagy in controlling the unregulated cell growth linked to cancer has been proposed.

This gene belongs to the autophagy-related protein 4 (Atg4) family of C54 endopeptidases. Members of this family encode proteins that play a role in the biogenesis of autophagosomes, which sequester the cytosol and organelles for degradation by lysosomes. Alternative splicing results in multiple transcript variants. [provided by RefSeq, Jul 2013].
