= Euglobulin lysis time =

- Test of: Overall fibrinolysis

The euglobulin lysis time (ELT) is a test that measures overall fibrinolysis. The test is performed by mixing citrated platelet-poor plasma with acid in a glass test tube. This acidification causes the precipitation of certain clotting factors in a complex called the euglobulin fraction. The euglobulin fraction contains the important fibrinolytic factors fibrinogen, PAI-1, tissue plasminogen activator (tPA), plasminogen, and to a lesser extent α_{2}-antiplasmin. The euglobulin fraction also contains factor VIII.

After precipitation, the euglobulin fraction is resuspended in a borate solution. Clotting is then activated by the addition of calcium chloride at 37 °C. Historically, subsequent amount of fibrinolysis was determined by eye, by observing the clot within the test tube at ten-minute intervals until complete lysis had occurred. Newer automated methods have also been developed. These methods use the same principle as the older technique, but use a spectrophotometer to track clot lysis as a function of optical density.
