= ADAM10 endopeptidase =

Class of enzymes

Identifiers
- EC no.: 3.4.24.81
- CAS no.: 193099-09-1

Databases
- IntEnz: IntEnz view
- BRENDA: BRENDA entry
- ExPASy: NiceZyme view
- KEGG: KEGG entry
- MetaCyc: metabolic pathway
- PRIAM: profile
- PDB structures: RCSB PDB PDBe PDBsum
Search
- PMC: articles
- PubMed: articles
- NCBI: proteins

ADAM10 endopeptidase (EC 3.4.24.81, Kuzbanian protein, myelin-associated disintegrin metalloproteinase) is an enzyme. This enzyme catalyses the following chemical reaction

Endopeptidase of broad specificity

This enzyme belongs to the peptidase family M12.
