= ADAMTS-4 endopeptidase =

Class of enzymes

Identifiers
- EC no.: 3.4.24.82
- CAS no.: 147172-61-0

Databases
- BRENDA: enzyme data
- ExPASy: NiceZyme view
- KEGG: enzyme entry
- MetaCyc: metabolic pathway
- Rhea: reactions
- PDB structures: RCSB PDB PDBe PDBsum
Search
- PMC: articles
- PubMed: articles
- NCBI: proteins

ADAMTS-4 endopeptidase (EC 3.4.24.82, aggrecanase-1) is an enzyme. This enzyme catalyses the following chemical reaction

Glutamyl endopeptidase; bonds cleaved include -Thr-Glu-Gly-Glu^{373}-Ala-Arg-Gly-Ser- in the interglobular domain of mammalian aggrecan

This enzyme belongs to the peptidase family M12.
