= Barrierpepsin =

Identifiers
- EC no.: 3.4.23.35
- CAS no.: 152060-38-3

Databases
- IntEnz: IntEnz view
- BRENDA: BRENDA entry
- ExPASy: NiceZyme view
- KEGG: KEGG entry
- MetaCyc: metabolic pathway
- PRIAM: profile
- PDB structures: RCSB PDB PDBe PDBsum
Search
- PMC: articles
- PubMed: articles
- NCBI: proteins

Barrierpepsin (EC 3.4.23.35, barrier proteinase, Bar proteinase) is an enzyme. This enzyme catalyses the following chemical reaction

Selective cleavage of -Leu^{6}-Lys- bond in the pheromone alpha-mating factor

This endopeptidase is present in baker's yeast (Saccharomyces cerevisiae).
