= Ananain =

Enzyme

Identifiers
- EC no.: 3.4.22.31
- CAS no.: 119129-70-3

Databases
- IntEnz: IntEnz view
- BRENDA: BRENDA entry
- ExPASy: NiceZyme view
- KEGG: KEGG entry
- MetaCyc: metabolic pathway
- PRIAM: profile
- PDB structures: RCSB PDB PDBe PDBsum
Search
- PMC: articles
- PubMed: articles
- NCBI: proteins

Ananain (EC 3.4.22.31, stem bromelain, fruit bromelain) is an enzyme. This enzyme catalyses the following chemical reaction

Hydrolysis of proteins with broad specificity for peptide bonds. Best reported small molecule substrate Bz-Phe-Val-Arg-NHMec

This enzyme is isolated from stem of pineapple plant, Ananas comosus.
