= E64 =

E64 may refer to:

- BMW E64, a car model in the BMW 6 Series
- European route E64, a series of roads in Italy, part of the United Nations International E-road network
- E-64, an epoxide which can irreversibly inhibit a wide range of cysteine peptidases
- King's Indian Defence, Encyclopaedia of Chess Openings code
- Tsugaru Expressway, route E64 in Japan
