= Bandolier (disambiguation) =

A bandolier is a pocketed belt for holding ammunition.

Bandolier may also refer to:

- Bandolier bag
- Bandolier (album), a 1975 album by the hard rock group Budgie
- Bandolier (journal), an independent online electronic journal
- HMAS Bandolier (P 95), an Attack class patrol boat
- Minneapolis Bandolier, a bandy club

== See also ==
- Bandelier (disambiguation)
