= Ophiolysin =

Identifiers
- EC no.: 3.4.24.51

Databases
- IntEnz: IntEnz view
- BRENDA: BRENDA entry
- ExPASy: NiceZyme view
- KEGG: KEGG entry
- MetaCyc: metabolic pathway
- PRIAM: profile
- PDB structures: RCSB PDB PDBe PDBsum
Search
- PMC: articles
- PubMed: articles
- NCBI: proteins

Ophiolysin (EC 3.4.24.51, Ophiophagus metalloendopeptidase) is an enzyme. This enzyme catalyses the following chemical reaction

Cleavage of Asn^{3}-Gln, Gln^{4}-His, His^{10}-Leu, Ala^{14}-Leu, and Tyr^{16}-Leu in insulin B chain

This endopeptidase is present in the venom of the king cobra (Ophiophagus hannah)
