= Procollagen C-endopeptidase =

Identifiers
- EC no.: 3.4.24.19
- CAS no.: 68651-95-6

Databases
- IntEnz: IntEnz view
- BRENDA: BRENDA entry
- ExPASy: NiceZyme view
- KEGG: KEGG entry
- MetaCyc: metabolic pathway
- PRIAM: profile
- PDB structures: RCSB PDB PDBe PDBsum
Search
- PMC: articles
- PubMed: articles
- NCBI: proteins

Procollagen C-endopeptidase (EC 3.4.24.19, procollagen C-terminal proteinase, carboxyprocollagen peptidase, procollagen C-terminal peptidase, procollagen C-proteinase, procollagen carboxypeptidase, procollagen carboxy-terminal proteinase, procollagen peptidase) is an enzyme. This enzyme catalyses the following chemical reaction

Cleavage of the C-terminal propeptide at Ala-Asp in type I and II procollagens and at Arg-Asp in type III

This endopeptidase belongs to the peptidase family M12 (astacin family).
