= Proteases (medical and related uses) =

Proteases (also sometimes referred to as proteolytic enzymes or peptidases) are in use, or have been proposed or tried, for a number of purposes related to medicine or surgery. Some preparations involving protease have undergone successful clinical trials and have regulatory authorization; and some further ones have shown apparently useful effects in experimental medical studies. Proteases have also been used by proponents of alternative therapies, or identified in materials of traditional or folk medicine. A serine protease of human origin, activated protein C, was produced in recombinant form and marketed as Drotrecogin alfa (also known as Xigris (TM)) and licensed for intensive-care treatment of severe sepsis. It was voluntarily withdrawn by the manufacturer in 2011 after being shown to be ineffective.

Some of these uses rely directly on the proteolytic activity: others rely on observations of anti-inflammatory activity.

== Medical and surgical applications ==
=== Treatment of blood clots in ischemic stroke ===
Tissue plasminogen activator (TPA) is a serine protease occurring in animals including humans. Human-identical TPA (produced industrially by genetically recombinant microorganisms) has an established medical use in the treatment of ischemic stroke: by its proteolytic activity it enables the action of another enzyme (plasmin), which breaks down the protein (fibrin) of blood clots.

Venombin A from snake venom were used in stokes to deplete fibrinogen by forming very weak clots that can be easily dissolved. Available evidence does not support any benefit in such usage.

=== Wound debridement ===
Debridement involves the removal of dead or damaged tissue from wounds in order to assist healing. Much of the debris to be removed is proteinaceous, and proteolytic enzymes have been applied to this purpose.

Papain is a protease obtained from the latex of the fruit of the papaya tree. It has been used (without regulation) for wound debridement for many years, but in the US in 2008 it was brought under regulation by the U.S. Food and Drug Administration and removed from sale for this purpose, following reports of adverse effects. On the other hand, recent research has been exploring new ways of administering papain for wound debridement.

Papain as well as other proteases, including bromelain, collagenase, trypsin and thermolysin, have also been tried or used according to other reports on the use of proteases for debridement of wounds and burns without damaging healthy tissue.

Maggot therapy for wound debridement is a traditional therapy which was in recent years approved by the FDA. It has been identified that the maggots produce proteolytic enzymes which take part in the debridement process.

=== Applications of proteases auxiliary to antibiotic therapy ===
Some pathogenic bacteria produce biofilms or exudates containing protein, which in some degree help the bacteria adhere to host tissue, or in some degree physically shield the bacteria or hinder the penetration of substances such as antibiotics administered with the intent that they contact the bacteria. Accordingly, proteolytic enzymes have been tried in conjunction with antibiotics. Thus, it has been reported that Serratia sp. E-15 protease (also known as serratiopeptidase; P07268) was effective for eradicating infection caused by biofilm-forming bacteria in an experimental animal model (which involved carrying out experimental limb surgery on rats, at the same time experimentally introducing Staphylococcus infection). The authors considered that "The antibiofilm property of the enzyme may enhance antibiotic efficacy in the treatment of staphylococcal infections."

The same enzyme, when used concomitantly with an antibiotic, was also reported to increase antibiotic concentration at a target site.

=== Applications of protease for enzyme therapy ===
Protease is also capable of medical applications. It is one of the enzymes in Sollpura (Liprotamase), a pancreatic enzyme replacement therapy (PERT). It assists in the breakdown of proteins into amino acids and polypeptides.

== Applications of protease based on anti-inflammatory activity ==
Bromelain is a protease usually obtained from pineapple stem tissue, which has been medically used for its anti-inflammatory effects (see Bromelain - medical uses).

Serratia E-15 protease (also known as serratiopeptidase or serrapeptidase) is another protease that has been proposed as an anti-inflammatory agent. Anti-inflammatory effects of this protease have been reported again more recently, and the material has come into some use in alternative or complementary medicine. On the other hand, it does not appear that there are positive clinical trial results for this material of a kind that would be needed to gain regulatory approval for controlled pharmaceutical uses.

== See also ==
- Nattokinase
