= Magnolysin =

Identifiers
- EC no.: 3.4.24.62
- CAS no.: 162875-09-4

Databases
- IntEnz: IntEnz view
- BRENDA: BRENDA entry
- ExPASy: NiceZyme view
- KEGG: KEGG entry
- MetaCyc: metabolic pathway
- PRIAM: profile
- PDB structures: RCSB PDB PDBe PDBsum
Search
- PMC: articles
- PubMed: articles
- NCBI: proteins

Magnolysin (EC 3.4.24.62, bovine neurosecretory granule protease cleaving pro-oxytocin/neurophysin, pro-oxytocin/neurophysin convertase, prooxyphysin proteinase, pro-oxytocin convertase) is an enzyme. This enzyme catalyses the following chemical reaction

Hydrolysis of polypeptides with Arg or Lys in P1 and P2, e.g. to hydrolyse pro-oxytocin at -Lys-Arg-Ala-Val-.

This endopeptidase is present in bovine pituitary neurosecretory granules.
