= PLGLB2 =

Protein-coding gene in the species Homo sapiens

Identifiers
- Aliases: PLGLB2, PLGP1, plasminogen-like B2, PLGLA1, PLGP2, PLGLA, PRGA, plasminogen like B2
- External IDs: GeneCards: PLGLB2

Gene location (Human)
| Chr. | Chromosome 2 (human) |
| Band | 2p11.2 | Start | 87,748,087 bp |
| Band | 2p11.2 | End | 87,759,476 bp |
RNA expression pattern
| Bgee | Human / Mouse (ortholog); Top expressed in: right lobe of liver; testicle; right hemisphere of cerebellum; endometrium; granulocyte; gonad; bone marrow cell; blood; spleen; body of pancreas / n/a; More reference expression data |
| BioGPS | n/a |
Orthologs
| Databases | NCBI: entry; OMA: entry |
| Species | Human | Mouse |
| Entrez | 5342 | n/a |
| Ensembl | ENSG00000125551 | n/a |
| UniProt | Q02325 | n/a |
| RefSeq (mRNA) | NM_002665 | n/a |
| RefSeq (protein) | NP_001027564 | n/a |
| Location (UCSC) | Chr 2: 87.75 – 87.76 Mb | n/a |
| PubMed search | | n/a |
- Wikidata
| View/Edit Human |

Plasminogen-related protein B is a protein that in humans is encoded by the PLGLB2 gene.
