= HIV-2 protease =

Class of enzymes in HIV

HIV-2 retropepsin

Identifiers
- EC no.: 3.4.23.47
- CAS no.: 144114-21-6

Databases
- BRENDA: enzyme data
- ExPASy: NiceZyme view
- KEGG: enzyme entry
- MetaCyc: metabolic pathway
- Rhea: reactions
- PDB structures: RCSB PDB PDBe PDBsum
Search
- PMC: articles
- PubMed: articles
- NCBI: proteins

HIV-2 protease or retropepsin (EC 3.4.23.47) is an enzyme. This enzyme catalyses the following chemical reaction

Endopeptidase for which the P1 residue is preferably hydrophobic

This enzyme belongs to the peptidase family A2.
