= Serratiopeptidase =

Enzyme produced by enterobacterium

Serralysin
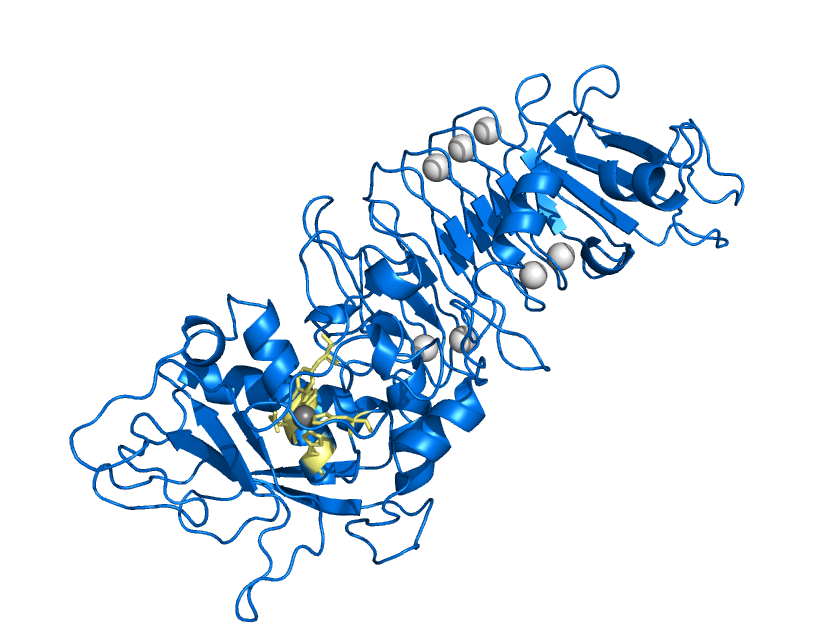
- Crystal structure of serralysin with co-ordinated zinc (grey) and calcium (white). Rendered from PDB 1SAT.

Identifiers
- EC no.: 3.4.24.40
- CAS no.: 70851-98-8

Databases
- BRENDA: enzyme data
- ExPASy: NiceZyme view
- KEGG: enzyme entry
- MetaCyc: metabolic pathway
- Rhea: reactions
- PDB structures: RCSB PDB PDBe PDBsum
Search
- PMC: articles
- PubMed: articles
- NCBI: proteins

Serratiopeptidase

Identifiers
- Organism: Serratia sp. E-15
- Symbol: Spro_0210
- Entrez: 5605823
- Orthologs: NCBI: entry; OMA: entry
- PDB: 1SRP
- UniProt: P07268

Other data
- EC number: 3.4.24.40
Search for
- Structures: Swiss-model
- Domains: InterPro

Serratiopeptidase (Serratia E-15 protease, also known as serralysin, serrapeptase, serratiapeptase, serratia peptidase, serratio peptidase, or serrapeptidase) is a proteolytic enzyme (protease) produced by enterobacterium Serratia sp. E-15, now known as Serratia marcescens ATCC 21074. This microorganism was originally isolated in the late 1960s from silkworm (Bombyx mori L.) intestine. Serratiopeptidase is present in the silkworm intestine and allows the emerging moth to dissolve its cocoon. Serratiopeptase is produced by purification from culture of Serratia E-15 bacteria. It is a member of the Peptidase M10B (Matrixin) family.

== Health claims ==
Some alternative medicine proponents claim that serratiopeptidase is beneficial for pain and inflammation but "existing trials [have been] small and generally of poor methodological quality." Online medical journal Bandolier (specializing in evidence-based thinking about healthcare) published an article (in about 2001) in response to a reader's enquiry about serratiopeptidase. (Note: The Bandolier article is undated and unsigned, but the text indicates that it was written in response to a letter sent by a reader of a newspaper article that was published in 2001. No references later than 2001 are cited.) After searching PubMed and the Cochrane Library "to see if there are any randomised, controlled trials", the article stated that the "evidence on serratiopeptidase being effective for anything is not based on a firm foundation of clinical trials."

The search found 34 publications in the medical databases covered that addressed the efficacy of serratiopeptidase, of which several were found to be animal experiments, personal letters, uncontrolled trials or those with inadequate or nonexistent randomisation. The article warned against ignoring safety issues with use of biological agents. No studies were found to have been conducted on the efficacy of serratiopeptidase as treatment for back pain, heart attack, stroke, or asthma. Of the 10 medical conditions with randomized-evidence studies on file in connection with serratiopeptidase, the quality or construction of the trial studies was described as "generally poor". (Note: According to Bandolier: "Studies were small, outcomes were poorly defined, and in some, different medical conditions were mixed. Five studies were described as double blind: one was completely uninterpretable, three methodologically weak studies were positive, and one trial of apparent high quality was negative. This latter study compared serratiopeptidase, serraprose S or placebo in the treatment of chronic respiratory disease, with about 120 patients per group, and found no significant difference between groups for any outcome." — Bandolier, "Serratiopeptidase - Finding the Evidence")

== See also ==
- Proteases (medical and related uses)
