= Glutamyl endopeptidase GluV8 =

Extracellular serine protease

Glutamyl endopeptidase
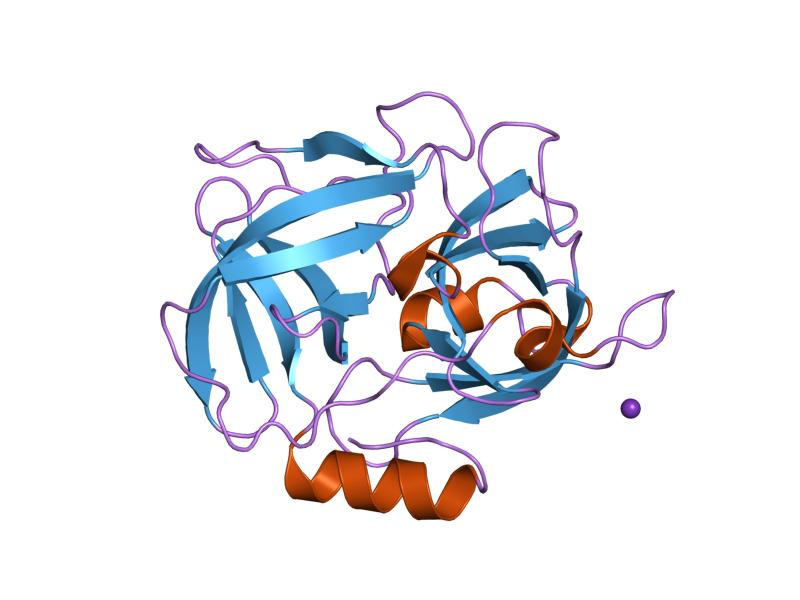

Identifiers
- EC no.: 3.4.21.19
- CAS no.: 137010-42-5

Databases
- BRENDA: enzyme data
- ExPASy: NiceZyme view
- KEGG: enzyme entry
- MetaCyc: metabolic pathway
- Rhea: reactions
- PDB structures: RCSB PDB PDBe PDBsum
Search
- PMC: articles
- PubMed: articles
- NCBI: proteins

Glutamyl endopeptidase (EC 3.4.21.19, SspA, V8 protease, GluV8, endoproteinase Glu-C, staphylococcal serine proteinase) is an extracellular bacterial serine protease of the glutamyl endopeptidase I family that was initially isolated from the Staphylococcus aureus strain V8. The protease is, hence, commonly referred to as "V8 protease", or alternatively SspA from its corresponding gene.

== Genetics ==
Glutamyl endopeptidase is in S. aureus expressed from the gene sspA within the operon ssp. Downstream of sspA, the operon also includes the genes of the cysteine protease staphopain B (sspB) and of staphostatin B (sspC; specific inhibitor of staphopain B).

Glutamyl endopeptidase is largely co-expressed with the other major proteases of S. aureus: aureolysin, staphopain A, and staphopain B. The transcription of ssp, that occurs via a promoter controlled by "housekeeping" sigma factor σ^{A}, is up-regulated by accessory gene regulator agr, while it is repressed by staphylococcal accessory regulator sarA and by alternative sigma factor σ^{B} (a stress response modulator of Gram-positive bacteria). ssp expression is highly expressed in post-exponential growth phase. A more complex network of modulators and of environmental conditions affecting ssp expression have been suggested, however.

The sspA gene has a high prevalence in the genome of both commensal- and pathogenic-type S. aureus strains.

== Activation ==
Glutamyl endopeptidase is expressed as a zymogen that, in order to become fully active, has been modified both through autocatalysis and through cleavage by the metalloprotease aureolysin.

== Function ==
Glutamyl endopeptidase proteolytically activates the zymogen of the cysteine protease staphopain B (staphopain A is activated through and independent process).

The bacterial protease has a narrow specificity, with a strict preference for catalyzing hydrolysis of proteins after negatively charged amino acids, especially glutamic acid, and to some extent aspartic acid. Aspartic acid is cleaved mainly when followed by a small amino acid, such as glycine.

Glutamyl endopeptidase has been shown to cleave certain target proteins among human inflammatory regulators and immune components. It can process kininogen into kinin, and cleave immunoglobulins. The protease also cleaves and inactivates α_{1}-antitrypsin, but is successfully inhibited by α_{2}-macroglubulin. Glutamyl endopeptidase can inhibit the activation of targets within the complement system. It is indicated to cause inhibition to all three pathways of complement activation.

Glutamyl endopeptidase can furthermore cleave a wide array bacterial surface proteins, including fibronectin-binding proteins and protein A, potentially acting as a self-regulatory mechanism.

== Biological significance ==
An immunization survey of human serum samples suggests that exposure to glutamyl endopeptidase is common, although a correlation to any specific type of infection could not be established. The numerous targets of bacterial proteases, adding the complexity of other virulence factors and their genetic regulation, makes it difficult to attribute a specific role of the protease for the bacteria. In vivo trials with S. aureus with inactivation of ssp or sspA controlling glutamyl endopeptidase gives a contradictory picture for its importance, although it has shown impact for bacterial survival in human whole blood. It has been suggested, however, that the protease promotes S. aureus dissemination through cleavage of self-proteins and through kinin-induced vasodilation, simultaneously protecting against immunological responses, i.e. through corruption of the regulation of the complement system and of neutrophil-derived proteases.

Glutamyl endopeptidase is indicated to participate in control and dissemination in bacterial biofilms.

The protease can contribute to infection symptoms, e.g. pain and edema through increased vascular permeability by activating kinin. De-regulation of neutrophil proteases through inactivation of α_{1}-antitrypsin has been suggested as a potential cause of dysfunctional coagulation in sepsis.
