= Bandelier (disambiguation) =

Bandelier most commonly refers to Bandelier National Monument in New Mexico, United States.

Bandelier may also refer to:

- Bandelier Tuff, a geologic formation found in the monument
- Adolph Francis Alphonse Bandelier (1840–1914), Swiss-American archaeologist for whom the monument is named

== See also ==
- Bandolier (disambiguation)
