= Hypoplasminogenemia =

- Other names: Plasminogen deficiency type 1

Hypoplasminogenemia, also known as plasminogen deficiency type 1, is a genetic disorder characterized by a lack of the protein plasminogen, which is responsible for the ability of the body to break down fibrin clots. Plasminogen deficiency leads to an accumulation of fibrin, causing the development of growths (lesions) that can impair normal tissue and organ function and may lead to blindness when these lesions affect the eyes.

It is caused by mutations in the PLG gene.

== Treatment ==
Plasminogen, human-tvmh (Ryplazim) was approved for medical use in the United States in June 2021. It is the first therapy for hypoplasminogenemia approved by the U.S. Food and Drug Administration (FDA).
