= Thromboelastometry =

Viscoelastic method for hemostasis testing in whole blood

- Synonyms: Rotational thromboelastography
- Purpose: method for hemostasis testing in whole blood.

Thromboelastometry (TEM), previously named rotational thromboelastography (ROTEG) or rotational thromboelastometry (ROTEM), is an established viscoelastic method for hemostasis testing in whole blood. It is a modification of traditional thromboelastography (TEG).

TEM investigates the interaction of coagulation factors, their inhibitors, anticoagulant drugs, blood cells, specifically platelets, during clotting and subsequent fibrinolysis. The rheological conditions mimic the sluggish flow of blood in veins.

While traditional thromboelastography is a global assay for blood clotting disorders and drug effects, TEM is primarily used in combination with appropriate differential assays. They allow testing in the presence of therapeutic heparin concentrations and provide differential diagnostic information to support decisions in therapy. In numerous publications, the validity of the method is shown. Application of TEM at the point of care (POC) or in emergency laboratories is getting more and more popular. TEM detects both hypo- and hyperfunctional stages of the clotting process and is probably the only reliable rapid test for the diagnosis of hyperfibrinolysis. In contrast to standard clotting tests, the fibrin-stabilizing effect of factor XIII contributes to the result.

The rapid availability of results helps to discriminate surgical bleeding from a true haemostasis disorder and improves the therapy with blood products, factor concentrates, anticoagulants and protamine, hemostyptic and antifibrinolytic drugs. Several reports confirm that application of TEM is cost effective by reducing the consumption of blood products.

== Method ==
Blood (300 μL, anticoagulated with citrate) is placed into the disposable cuvette using an electronic pipette. A disposable pin is attached to a shaft which is connected with a thin spring (the equivalent to Hartert’s torsion wire in thrombelastography) and slowly oscillates back and forth. The signal of the pin suspended in the blood sample is transmitted via an optical detector system. The test is started by adding appropriate reagents. The instrument measures and graphically displays the changes in elasticity at all stages of the developing and resolving clot. The typical test temperature is 37 °C, but different temperatures can be selected, e.g. for patients with hypothermia.

In contrast to thrombelastography with its pendulum-like principle, the design of the TEM viscoelastic detection system (figure 1) makes it quite robust and insensitive against mechanical shocks or vibrations.

== Result ==
The primary result of TEM is a reaction curve which shows the elasticity over time when the clot forms or dissolves. This curve is also called a TEMogram. Four key parameters describe the clotting curve for clinical routine. More than 10 additional calculated parameters, including derivative curves which are useful in specific research applications, e.g. in hemophilia or thrombophilia or for the effects of recombinant FVIIa are available for research purposes.

== Measurement parameters ==
CT (Clotting time): The CT is the latency time from adding the start reagent to blood until the clot starts to form. Prolongation of CT may be a result of coagulation deficiencies, primarily coagulation factors, or heparin (dependent on the test used). A potential contribution of heparin can be detected by comparing INTEM- with HEPTEM CT data (see “reagents” below). A shortening of CT indicates hypercoagulability.

CFT (Clot formation time) and alpha-angle: The alpha angle is the angle of tangent between 0 mm and the curve when the clot firmness is 20 mm, while CFT is the time from CT until a clot firmness of 20 mm point has been reached. These parameters denote the speed at which a solid clot forms and are primarily influenced by platelet function, but to a certain extent especially fibrinogen and coagulation factors contribute. A prolonged CFT (or a lower alpha-angle) is usually caused by poor platelet function, low platelet count, fibrin polymerization disorders or fibrinogen deficiency. Apparently also FXIII seems to be involved already in this phase. Higher concentrations of heparin can also prolong CFT in the INTEM assay, but not in HEPTEM, EXTEM, FIBTEM or APTEM (see under “reagents”). A shortening of CFT (or a high alpha-angle) indicate hypercoagulability.

MCF (Maximum clot firmness): MCF is the greatest vertical amplitude of the trace. It reflects the absolute strength of the fibrin and platelet clot. A low MCF is indicative of decreased platelet number or function, decreased fibrinogen level or fibrin polymerization disorders, or low activity of factor XIII. A mechanically weak clot represents a severe bleeding risk and should initiate immediate therapeutic steps. High doses of heparin can lower MCF in the INTEM assay, but not in HEPTEM, EXTEM, FIBTEM or APTEM (see under “reagents”).

A5, A10, A15 or A20 value These values describe the clot firmness (or amplitude) obtained after 10, 15 or 20 minutes (beginning from CFT) and provide a forecast on the expected MCF value at an earlier stage already. A recent investigation has validated this approach for the A15 value in more than 800 cases during liver transplantation. The advantage of the A15-values is obvious: It allows for a more rapid decision about therapeutic interventions.

LI 30 (Lysis Index after 30 minutes) and ML (Maximum Lysis) The LI30 value is the percentage of remaining clot stability in relation to the MCF value at 30 min after CT. A similar value can also be calculated at other time points (45 or 60 min). The ML parameter describes the percentage of lost clot stability (relative to MCF, in %) viewed at any selected time point or when the test has been stopped. A low LI (X) value or a high ML value indicates hyperfibrinolysis. While in normal blood fibrinolysis activity is quite low, in clinical samples a more rapid loss of clot stability by hyperfibrinolysis may lead to bleeding complications which can be treated by the administration of antifibrinolytic drugs.

== TEM assays ==
Initially, thrombelastography was simply performed with whole blood without adding reagents (except calcium when citrate anticoagulated blood was used). This provides a global overview about all phases of clot formation, stabilization and degradation. In the case of monocausal haemostasis disorders, the resulting reaction curves may be quite typical; however, under most clinical conditions this approach has severe limitations. In reality various effects overlap, including haemodilution or application of high doses of parenteral anticoagulants. High doses of heparin often prevent clot formation at all. Absence of a controlled activation step leads to inferior reproducibility and very long test times which are not acceptable for POC applications. The assays for ROTEM analysis help to get a rapid differentiation between various potential haemostasis defects or anticoagulant drug effects and allow for a rapid differential diagnosis. They form the base for selecting a therapeutic strategy. Several diagnostic algorithms have been proposed and were clinically validated. Application of this strategy helps to minimize the exposure of patients to allogeneic blood products which have certain risks; and it saves costs. Numerous research applications have used the technique as well.

== Tests ==
INTEM This test mildly activates the contact phase of haemostasis. The result is influenced by coagulation factors, platelets, fibrinogen and heparin. Low molecular weight heparin is detected at higher concentrations. In the absence of heparin, INTEM is a screening test for the haemostasis system. It is used for therapeutic decisions regarding the administration of fresh frozen plasma, coagulation factors, fibrinogen or platelets.

HEPTEM This assay represents an INTEM assay performed in the presence of heparinase, a heparin (or LMWH) degrading enzyme. It allows the identification of haemostasis deficiencies even in the presence of heparin and represents an INTEM test without interference by heparin or heparin like anticoagulants. The difference between HEPTEM and INTEM CT-value comparison confirms the presence of heparin, e.g. accidental exposure.

EXTEM test mildly activates haemostasis via the physiological activator tissue factor. The result is influenced by extrinsic coagulation factors, platelets and fibrinogen. EXTEM is a screening test for the (extrinsic) haemostasis system. This assay is not influenced by heparin (heparin inhibitor included in the EXTEM reagent). It is used for therapeutic decisions regarding the administration of fresh frozen plasma, coagulation factors, fibrinogen or platelets. EXTEM is also the base activator for FIBTEM and APTEM.

FIBTEM test is an EXTEM based assay for the fibrin part of the clot. FIBTEM eliminates the platelet contribution of clot formation by inhibiting the platelets irreversibly with cytochalasin D, a potent inhibitor of actin polymerization which disrupts actin microfilaments, an essential part of a cytoskeleton-mediated contractibility apparatus of the platelet. The use of cytochalasin is more favorable than using glycoprotein IIb/ IIIa inhibitors which block platelet incompletely, especially at higher platelet counts. FIBTEM allows for the detection of fibrinogen deficiency or fibrin polymerization disorders, e.g. induced by certain plasma expanders, and may identify rapidly the need to substitute fibrinogen. FIBTEM results correlate well in many cases with the Clauss fibrinogen assay, but is additionally influenced by fibrin polymerization disorders which cannot reliably be detected with clotting tests.

APTEM test is an EXTEM based assay in which fibrinolysis is inhibited by aprotinin in the reagent. A significant improvement of the clot in APTEM compared to EXTEM allows to detect fulminant hyperfibrinolysis. Therefore, the test helps in identifying the necessity of administrating antifibrinolytic drugs. Furthermore, APTEM enables the estimation if an antifibrinolytic therapy alone normalizes coagulation or if additional measures have to be taken (e.g. administration of fibrinogen or platelets).

== Quality control ==
Quality control is an important requirement in laboratory and POC testing. An automatic internal electronic control procedure is implemented in the ROTEM whole blood analyzer. Furthermore, biological control materials at 2 different levels are available and should be used in order to document quality and validity of results.

== Clinical application ==
TEM is successfully used in the near patient assessment of haemostasis. The method allows detection of complex haemostasis disorders (available in most coagulopathies) within a few minutes and thus enables rapid therapeutic intervention. Whole blood TEM is sensitive to haemostasis affecting agents such as plasma expanders or acidosis while the effects of these agents are hardly identified by plasma based laboratory tests. TEM-guided transfusion of blood products or factor concentrates in cardiac, hepatic and major orthopedic surgery is the main application of the method. Moreover, it is successfully used in the complex situation of (poly)trauma, or in decision making for of alternative therapy such as antifibrinolytic drug administration . The clinical benefits of TEM have resulted in major savings and publications recommend that viscoelastic methods such as TEM should be used in surgical procedures where major blood loss followed by the need for transfusions can be expected.

== Limitations of TEM ==
Like any other haemostasis evaluating method, TEM (and thrombelastography) have limitations which need to be considered when interpreting the results. The typical assays are not responsive for the effect of von Willebrand factor or platelet antagonists such as aspirin or thienopyridines (e.g. clopidogrel), and only supratherapeutic doses of GPIIb/IIIa antagonists may influence results. The sensitivity for coagulation factor deficiencies, including those induced by oral anticoagulation, is less pronounced as compared to clotting assays. Therefore, TEM is not meant to replace laboratory assays such as prothrombin time (PT) or factor assays. However, due to the rapid availability of differential diagnostic information, TEM has become an established method in surgical procedures where blood losses can be expected.
