= Glutamyl endopeptidase I =

Glutamyl endopeptidase I is a family of extracellular bacterial serine proteases. The proteases within this family have been identified in species of Staphylococcus, Bacillus, and Streptomyces, among others. The two former are more closely related, while the Streptomyces-type is treated as a separate family, glutamyl endopeptidase II.

== Identified proteases ==
Staphylococcus

- S. aureus glutamyl endopeptidase GluV8

The first discovered enzyme of this family, and the most well characterized, was isolated from the Staphylococcus aureus strain V8, and hence better known as "V8 protease". Other common references to this protease are staphylococcal serine protease, and SspA from its corresponding gene.

- S. epidermidis glutamyl endopeptidase GluSE

Also called S. epidermidis serine protease (Esp).

- S. warneri glutamyl endopeptidase GluSW

Also referred to as PROM.

Bacillus

- B. licheniformis glutamyl endopeptidase GluBL
- B. subtilis glutamyl endopeptidase GluBS

Enterococcus

- E. faecalis glutamyl endopeptidase SprE

== Function ==
Glutamyl endopeptidase is in at least some species part of a zymogen activation cascade, with its activity being dependent on proteolytic activation of a pre-form of the protease. GluV8 of S. aureus, for example, is dependent of activation by the metalloprotease aureolysin, and is itself needed for activation of staphopain B. GluSE, GluSW and SprE have been observed to be activated by a metalloprotease in a similar fashion.

Proteases of this group hydrolyzes peptide bonds after the negatively charged glutamic acid or aspartic acid, with a higher preference to the former. The pH optimum has been found to lie slightly above neutral pH (7-8) for GluV8 and GluBL.

It has been shown that in spite of their similarities, the proteases from different species may differ in their efficiency in cleaving biological targets. The GluV8 is suggested in several mechanisms of S. aureus immune evasion, and GluV8 and GluSE have shown impact on the regulation of biofilms.

== See also ==
- Proteolysis
