= Nattokinase =

Protease commonly found in natto

Subtilisin NAT
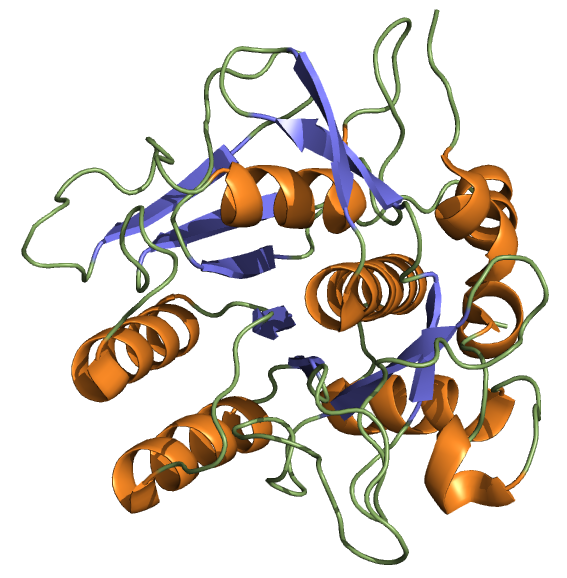
- Crystal structure of nattokinase. PDB 4dww.

Identifiers
- Organism: Bacillus subtilis natto
- Symbol: aprN
- Orthologs: OMA: entry
- UniProt: P35835

Other data
- EC number: 3.4.21.62
Search for
- Structures: Swiss-model
- Domains: InterPro

Nattokinase (pronounced nah-TOH-kin-ayss) is an enzyme originally extracted from a Japanese food called nattō. Nattō is produced by fermentation by adding the bacterium Bacillus subtilis var. natto, which also produces the enzyme, to boiled soybeans. In spite of its name, nattokinase is not a kinase enzyme (and should not be pronounced as such, i.e. nah-toh-KYN-ayss), but an extracellular serine protease of the subtilisin family (99.5% identical with subtilsin E). Rather, it is named for the fact that it is an enzyme produced by nattōkin (Japanese: 納豆 菌).

This enzyme is labeled subtilisin NAT (S08.044) in the MEROPS database. Synonyms include nattokinase, subtilisin QK, subtilisin QK02. The gene encodes a prepropeptide with a signal peptide and an inhibitor propeptide before the main enzyme chain (residues 107–381, theoretic molecular mass 27726.74). It has the designation Bac s 1 under the WHO/IUIS allergen nomenclature.

== Catalytic activity ==
=== In vitro ===
When in contact with human blood or blood clots, it exhibits a strong fibrinolytic activity. It can both cleave fibrin and inactivate plasminogen activator inhibitor-1 (PAI-1).

==== Fibrinolytic unit ====
The fibrinolytic unit (FU) is a measure of fibrinolytic activity used in the labeling of nattokinase supplements. It specifically measures the rate of tyrosine liberation in a solution of fibrin.

=== In vivo ===
==== Intravenous route ====
Nattokinase is able to dissolve blood clots when injected intravenously into rats.

==== Oral route ====
Although nattokinase should be digested and inactivated in the human gut like other proteins, one review reported that it has some effect when consumed orally.

Two studies examined the fate of nattokinase in the gut:

- A 1995 article reported that after rats received nattokinase injected into the duodenum, specific bands show up when blood serum is analyzed using Western blot and an anti-NK antibody. One band occurs at the same location as control nattokinase (28 kDa).
- A 2013 article reported that after ingestion, nattokinase can be detected in blood using enzyme-linked immunosorbent assay (ELISA). However, this is not sufficient proof that nattokinase is absorbed in a functional form, as ELISA frequently cross-reacts with digested versions of an antigen.

A 2018 review stated that convincing data is "available to demonstrate the bioavailability and metabolism of NK administered as an oral dose".

A double-blind randomized controlled trial published in 2021 reported that in "healthy individuals at low risk for CVD", nattokinase has no effect on carotid artery intima-media thickness and carotid arterial stiffness, two measures of subclinical atherosclerosis progression.

== Production ==
Nattokinase used to be extracted from nattō. The same molecule can now be produced more efficiently by recombinant means and in batch culture.

Many legume products are fermented using B. subtilis (or a close relative). Many contain an identical or near-identical protease with the ability to dissolve fibrin in vitro. These enzymes are referred to as nattokinase in some academic sources.

== Culture ==
The Japan Nattokinase Administration, an industry interest group, runs a certification program for nattokinase products that are derived only from natural B. subtilis var. natto. It considers all other sources "counterfeit".

== See also ==
- Proteases (medical and related uses)
- Nattō
