= E-64 =

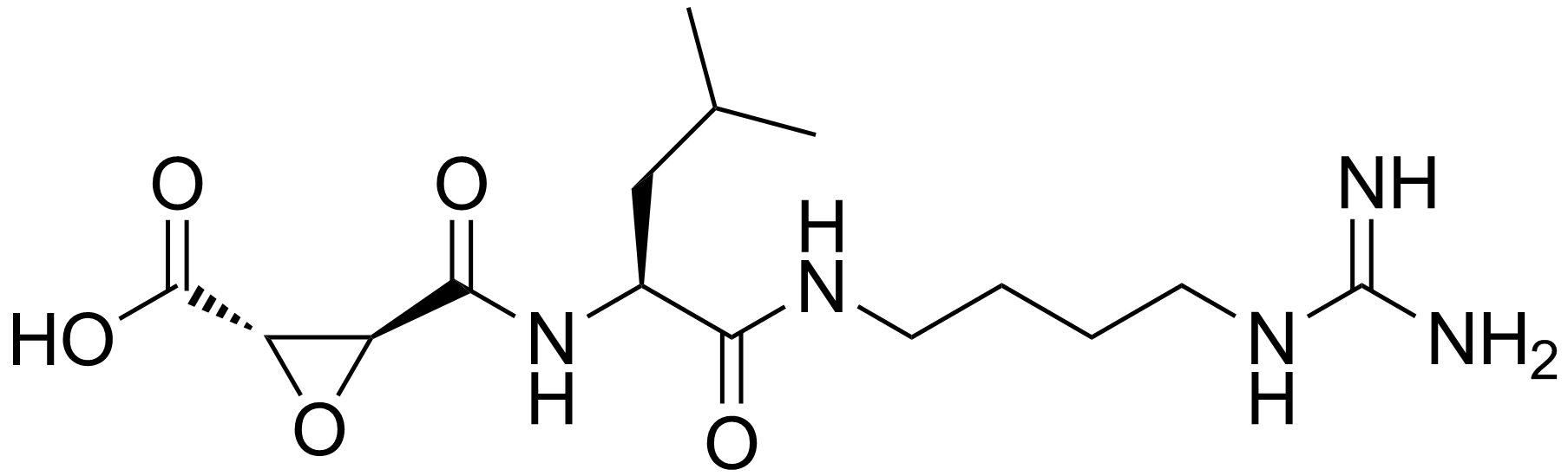

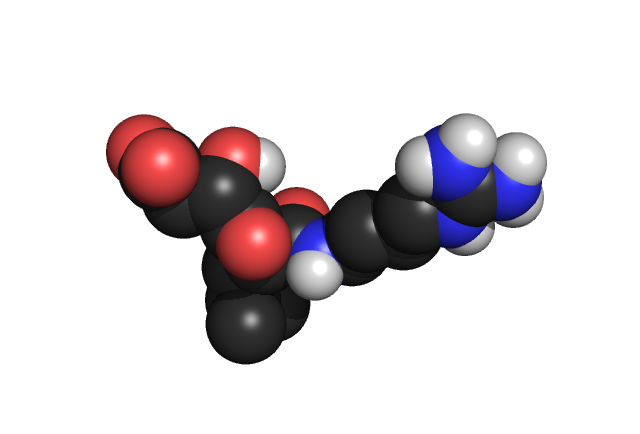

Names
- IUPAC name (1S,2S)-2-(((S)-1-((4-Guanidinobutyl)amino)-4-methyl-1-oxopentan-2-yl)carbamoyl)cyclopropanecarboxylic acid
- Other names E 64; Proteinase Inhibitor E 64; N-[N-(L-3-trans-carboxyirane-2-carbonyl)-L-leucyl]-agmatine; [1-[N-[(L-3-trans-carboxyoxirane-2-carbonyl)-L-leucyl]amino]-4-guanidinobutane]

Identifiers
CAS Number	66701-25-5
3D model (JSmol)	Interactive image
Beilstein Reference	6666631
ChEBI	CHEBI:30270
ChEMBL	ChEMBL374508
ChemSpider	110504
DrugBank	DB04276
ECHA InfoCard	100.130.729
EC Number	613-978-4
KEGG	C01341
PubChem CID	123985
UNII	R76F7856MV
CompTox Dashboard (EPA)	DTXSID90985271
- InChI: InChI=1S/C15H27N5O5/c1-8(2)7-9(20-13(22)10-11(25-10)14(23)24)12(21)18-5-3-4-6-19-15(16)17/h8-11H,3-7H2,1-2H3,(H,18,21)(H,20,22)(H,23,24)(H4,16,17,19)/t9-,10-,11-/m0/s1 Key: LTLYEAJONXGNFG-DCAQKATOSA-N; InChI=1/C15H27N5O5/c1-8(2)7-9(20-13(22)10-11(25-10)14(23)24)12(21)18-5-3-4-6-19-15(16)17/h8-11H,3-7H2,1-2H3,(H,18,21)(H,20,22)(H,23,24)(H4,16,17,19)/t9-,10-,11-/m0/s1 Key: LTLYEAJONXGNFG-DCAQKATOBY
- SMILES: OC([C@@H]1[C@@H](C(N[C@@H](CC(C)C)C(NCCCCNC(N)=N)=O)=O)O1)=O

Properties
Chemical formula	C_{15}H_{27}N_{5}O_{5}
Molar mass	357.411 g·mol^{−1}

Hazards
- GHS labelling
Pictograms	(GHS08: Health hazard)
Signal word	Warning
Hazard statements	H371
Precautionary statements	P260, P264, P270, P309+P311, P405, P501
- Except where otherwise noted, data are given for materials in their standard state (at 25 °C [77 °F], 100 kPa). verify (what is ?) Infobox references

E-64 is an epoxide which can irreversibly inhibit a wide range of cysteine peptidases.

The compound was first isolated and identified from Aspergillus japonicus in 1978. It has since been shown to inhibit many cysteine peptidases such as papain, cathepsin B, cathepsin L, calpain and staphopain.

The low toxic effects of the inhibitor, in addition to its effective mechanism of action, makes E-64 a potential template for drugs to treat diseases where high levels of a cysteine proteases are the primary cause.

== Structure and mechanism of inhibition ==
E-64 possesses a trans-epoxysuccinic acid group coupled to a modified dipeptide. The covalent attachment of E-64 to the active site cysteine occurs via nucleophillic attack from the thiol group of the cysteine on C2 of the epoxide. Early studies suggested that the amino-4-guanidinobutane bound in the S3' subsite and the leucyl group in the S2' subsite, however published crystal structures of E-64 complexed with papain indicated that E-64 binds via the S subsites.

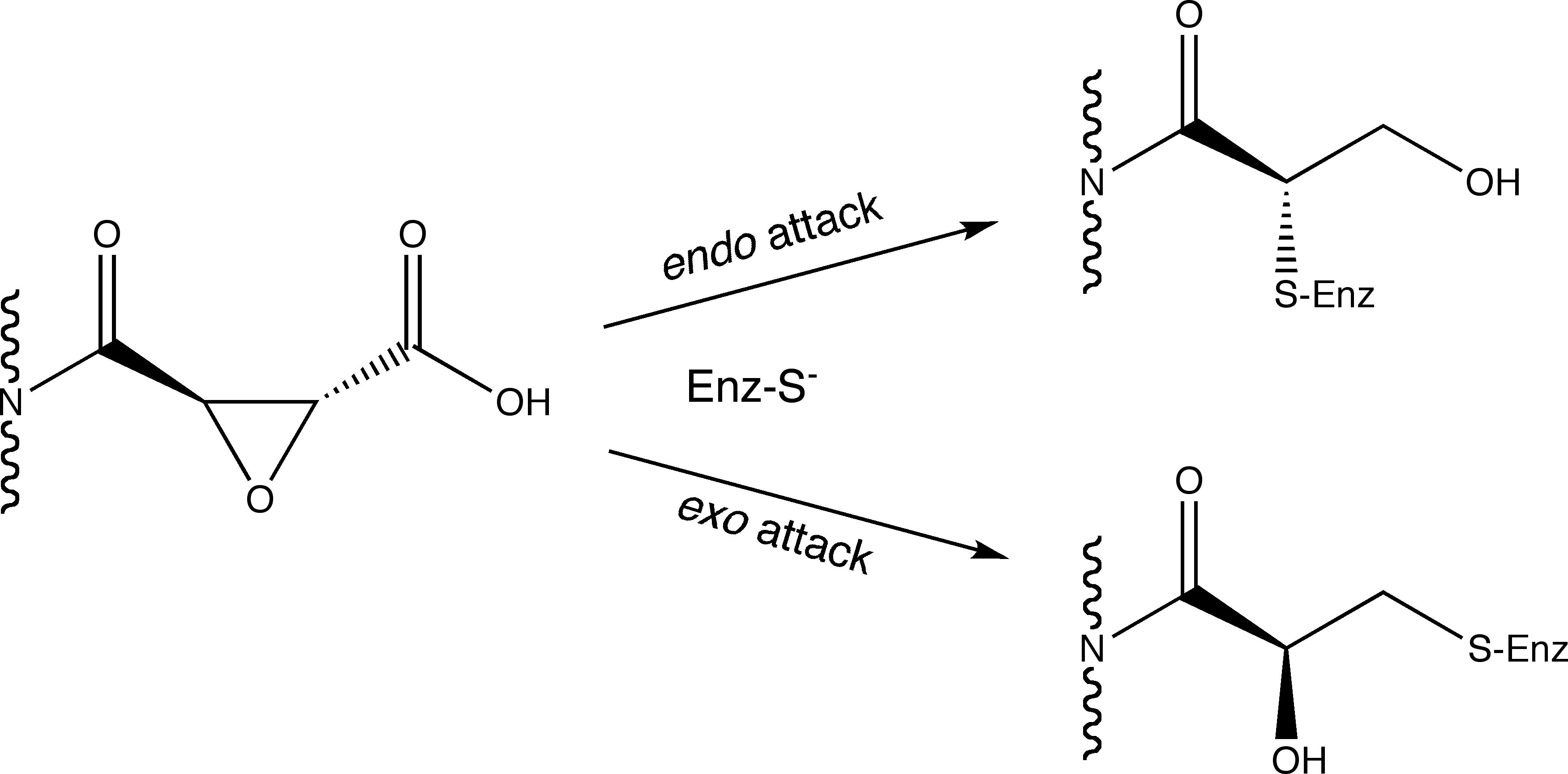
Mechanism of irreversible inhibition of cysteine peptidases by E-64.

== Biosynthesis of E-64 ==
The biosynthetic pathway of E-64 was elucidated by the Tang group at UCLA, who identified the enzymes responsible for constructing the epoxysuccinyl warhead and assembling the peptide scaffold. This work enabled enzymatic synthesis of diverse E-64–related cysteine protease inhibitors.

See also

- Aloxistatin
