= AF2 (disambiguation) =

AF2 is a defunct American arena football league.

AF2, AF-2 or variant, may also refer to:

- Furylfuramide
- USS Celtic (AF-2), US Navy stores ship
- Grumman AF-2 Guardian, ASW carrier plane
- (43797) 1991 AF2, an asteroid
- (9652) 1996 AF2, an asteroid
- Australian Formula 2

== See also ==
- 2 AF, the Second Air Force
- FA2 (disambiguation)
