= Lumbrokinase =

Class of fibrinolytic enzymes

Identifiers
- Organism: Earthworm
- Symbol: ?

Lumbrokinase is a class of fibrinolytic enzymes present in earthworm species including Lumbricus bimastus and Lumbricus rubellus.

This enzyme was first discovered in 1991 in earthworm saliva.
