= Aloxistatin =

Chemical compound

Clinical data
- ATC code: none

Legal status
- Legal status: US: Investigational drug

Identifiers
- IUPAC name: ethyl (2S,3S)-3-[[(2S)-4-methyl-1-(3-methylbutylamino)-1-oxopentan-2-yl]carbamoyl]oxirane-2-carboxylate
- CAS Number: 88321-09-9
- PubChem CID: 65663
- ChemSpider: 59098
- UNII: L5W337AOUR
- ChEBI: CHEBI:101381
- ChEMBL: ChEMBL63440
- CompTox Dashboard (EPA): DTXSID00904150
- ECHA InfoCard: 100.163.683

Chemical and physical data
- Formula: C_{17}H_{30}N_{2}O_{5}
- Molar mass: 342.436 g·mol^{−1}
- 3D model (JSmol): Interactive image
- SMILES: CCOC(=O)[C@@H]1[C@H](O1)C(=O)N[C@@H](CC(C)C)C(=O)NCCC(C)C
- InChI: InChI=1S/C17H30N2O5/c1-6-23-17(22)14-13(24-14)16(21)19-12(9-11(4)5)15(20)18-8-7-10(2)3/h10-14H,6-9H2,1-5H3,(H,18,20)(H,19,21)/t12-,13-,14-/m0/s1; Key:SRVFFFJZQVENJC-IHRRRGAJSA-N

Aloxistatin (loxistatin, E-64d, EST) is a drug which acts as a cysteine protease inhibitor and has anticoagulant effects. It is a synthetic analogue of E-64, a natural product derived from fungi. It was researched for the treatment of muscular dystrophy but was not successful in human clinical trials, though it has continued to be investigated for treatment of spinal cord injury, stroke and Alzheimer's disease.

Aloxistatin also shows antiviral effects. Studies have shown it can inhibit cathepsin L, a protein believed to play a role in SARS-CoV-2 cellular entry. In a laboratory study using SARS-CoV-2 pseudovirions, aloxistatin was able to reduce viral entry into cells by approximately 92%.
