= Staphopain A (Staphylococcus aureus) =

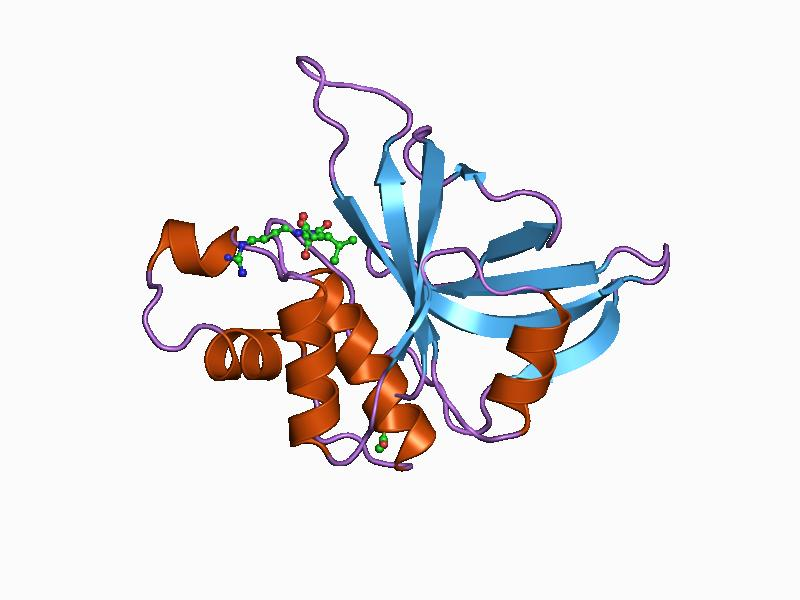

Identifiers
- EC no.: 3.4.22.48
- CAS no.: 347841-89-8

Databases
- BRENDA: enzyme data
- ExPASy: NiceZyme view
- KEGG: enzyme entry
- MetaCyc: metabolic pathway
- Rhea: reactions
- PDB structures: RCSB PDB PDBe PDBsum
Search
- PMC: articles
- PubMed: articles
- NCBI: proteins

Staphopain A (EC 3.4.22.48, ScpA, ScpA_{aur}, staphylopain A, staphylococcal cysteine proteinase) is a secreted cysteine protease produced by Staphylococcus aureus. It was first identified in the S. aureus V8 strain as a papain-like cysteine protease. The protease distinguishes itself from the other major proteases of S. aureus in its very broad specificity and its ability to degrade elastin.

== Genetics ==
Staphopain A expressed from the gene scpA within the scp operon. The operon also contains the gene scpB for staphostatin A (specific inhibitor of staphopain A), downstream of scpA.

Staphopain A is largely co-expressed with the other three major proteases of S. aureus: aureolysin, glutamyl endopeptidase, and staphopain B. The transcription of scp occurs via a promoter controlled by "housekeeping" sigma factor σ^{A} and up-regulated by accessory gene regulator agr. It is at also repressed by staphylococcal accessory regulator sarA and by alternative sigma factor σ^{B} (a stress response modulator of Gram-positive bacteria). ssp expression is highly expressed in post-exponential growth phase. A more complex network of modulators and of environmental conditions affecting ssp expression have been suggested, however. Up-regulation of aureolysin during phagocytosis have also been observed.

The scpA gene has a high prevalence in the genome of both commensal- and pathogenic-type S. aureus strains.

== Activation and inhibition ==
Staphopain A is expressed as an inactive zymogen. In contrast to the other proteases, however, it appears to undergo rapid autocatalytic activation. It is thus also independent of the activation cascade of the three other proteases.

S. aureus expresses the intracellular inhibitor staphostatin A, specific against staphopain A. As the activation of staphopain A could occur before it has been secreted by the bacteria, the staphostatin acts as prevention against harmful intracellular activity of the protease.

== Function ==
Staphopain A is elastinolytic to a degree fairly equal to that of neutrophil elastase, and has a very broad specificity proteolysis.

Staphopain A is inhibited by phosphorylated cystatin α and α_{2}-macroglobulin.

Staphopain A can cleave and lower the activity α_{1}-antitrypsin, and inactivate several complement system components.

== Biological significance ==
Staphopain A was shown to inhibit activation of the complement system activation by cleaving components that are part of all three pathways (the classical, alternative, and lectin pathways) of activation. It shows a duplex role in affecting chemotaxis; while inactivating neutrophil CXCR2 receptor, generates an active C5a fragment of C5 (although inactivating C5b). However, it has yet to prove any significant impact on the outcome of infection. Inhibition of staphopain A by phosphorylated cystatin α did prevent colony formation in skin tissue, but the effect could also be attributed to staphopain B. Mutation of scpA did not show any impact on the outcome of a skin abscess nor a septic arthritis model. Overlapping activity with the other proteases, plus the complexity of virulence determinants and the infection site environment makes it difficult to determine the impact of the protease in pathogenesis.

The elastinolytic properties of the protease could assist in spread of bacteria and also symptomatically to connective tissue destruction.

Staphopain A participates in S. aureus self-regulatory events, by altering the phenotype of the bacteria via cleavage of surface proteins and by preventing biofilm formation.
