= Plasminogen (medication) =

Medication for hypoplasminogenemia

Clinical data
- Trade names: Ryplazim
- Other names: plasminogen, human-tvmh
- License data: US DailyMed: Plasminogen
- Routes of administration: Intravenous
- ATC code: None

Legal status
- Legal status: US: ℞-only

Identifiers
- CAS Number: 9001-91-6
- DrugBank: DB16701
- UNII: 1EF190B6M7

Plasminogen, sold under the brand name Ryplazim, is a biologic medication for the treatment of hypoplasminogenemia (plasminogen deficiency type 1). It is purified from human plasma and is administered intravenously.

The most common side effects include abdominal pain, bloating, nausea, bleeding, limb pain, fatigue, constipation, dry mouth, headache, dizziness, joint pain, and back pain.

Individuals with hypoplasminogenemia lack a protein called plasminogen, which is responsible for the ability of the body to break down fibrin clots. Plasminogen deficiency leads to an accumulation of fibrin, causing the development of growths (lesions) that can impair normal tissue and organ function and may lead to blindness when these lesions affect the eyes.

Plasminogen, human-tvmh was approved for medical use in the United States in June 2021. It is the first therapy for hypoplasminogenemia approved by the U.S. Food and Drug Administration (FDA).

== Medical uses ==
Plasminogen, human-tvmh is indicated for the treatment of people with plasminogen deficiency type 1, also referred to as hypoplasminogenemia, a disorder that can impair normal tissue and organ function and may lead to blindness.

== History ==
The effectiveness and safety of plasminogen is primarily based on one single-arm, open-label (unblinded) clinical trial enrolling 15 adult and pediatric participants with plasminogen deficiency type 1. All participants received plasminogen administered every two to four days for 48 weeks. The effectiveness of plasminogen was demonstrated by at least 50% improvement of their lesions in all 11 participants who had lesions at baseline, and absence of recurrent or new lesions in any of the 15 participants through the 48 weeks of treatment.

The U.S. Food and Drug Administration (FDA) granted the application for plasminogen orphan drug designation, fast track designation, priority review, and a rare pediatric disease priority review voucher. The FDA granted approval of Ryplazim to ProMetic Biotherapeutics Inc.
