= Fresh Aire II =

Studio album by Mannheim Steamroller
- Released: September 15, 1977
- Recorded: 1977
- Genre: New-age; symphonic rock
- Length: 35:47
- Label: American Gramaphone
- Producer: Don Sears and Chip Davis

Mannheim Steamroller chronology
Fresh Aire (1975)	Fresh Aire II (1977)	Fresh Aire III (1979)

Professional ratings
Review scores
Source	Rating
Allmusic	4/5 stars

Fresh Aire II is the second album that new-age musical group Mannheim Steamroller originally released in 1977. Each of the first four Fresh Aire albums is based on a season; Fresh Aire II's theme is fall.

Fresh Aire II is unique in the series in that it is largely based on a single melody, presented consistently in the "Fantasia" music cycle (tracks 1–9) which starts off with 'Chorale,' followed by the seven "doors," ending with the piece 'Fantasy' and in the closing track 'Going To Another Place.' The same melody also occasionally appears in other albums in the series in a form closest to the first few notes in "The First Door."

== Track listing ==
All tracks are written by Chip Davis.

No.	Title	Length
1.	"Chorale"	0:36
2.	"The First Door"	1:26
3.	"The Second Door"	2:02
4.	"The Third Door"	2:30
5.	"The Fourth Door"	3:50
6.	"The Fifth Door"	2:59
7.	"The Sixth Door"	1:28
8.	"Door Seven"	1:57
9.	"Fantasy"	1:24
10.	"Interlude V"	3:37
11.	"Velvet Tear"	2:44
12.	"A Shade Tree"	4:57
13.	"Toota Lute"	2:50
14.	"Going to Another Place"	3:20
Total length:		35:00

== Personnel ==
- Jackson Berkey – piano, harpsichord, synthesizer, Fender Rhodes, concert bells, vocal chant
- Eric Hansen – bass, lute, classical guitar
- Chip Davis – drums, recorders, dulcimer, percussion, vocal chant
- Walt Meskell – rhythm guitar
- Dave Kappy – French horn
- Gene Badgett – trumpet
- Bob Jenkins – oboe
- Melody Malec – harp
- Milt Bailey – vocal chant
- Hugh Brown, Dorothy Brown, Ginni Eldred, Merton Shatzkin, Joe Landes, Mortimer Alpert – violins
- Alex Sokol, Lucinda Gladics, James Hammond – viola
- Miriam Duffelmeyer, Beth McCollum, Jean Hassel – cello
