= Bromelain (pharmacology) =

Mixture of pineapple protease (fruit and stem)

Concentrate of proteolytic enzymes enriched in bromelain
Clinical data
- Trade names: Nexobrid
- Other names: Anacaulase-bcdb
- AHFS/Drugs.com: UK Drug Information
- License data: US DailyMed: Anacaulase
- Routes of administration: Topical
- ATC code: D03BA03 (WHO)

Legal status
- Legal status: UK: POM (Prescription only); US: ℞-only; EU: Rx-only; In general: ℞ (Prescription only)

Pharmacokinetic data
- Protein binding: ~50% (bromelain)
- Elimination half-life: 11.7±3.5 (8.5–19.9) hrs

Identifiers
- CAS Number: 37189-34-7
- DrugBank: DB12249
- ChemSpider: none
- UNII: ZLM4P8929R
- KEGG: D03162
- CompTox Dashboard (EPA): DTXSID901010881
- ECHA InfoCard: 100.029.599

Bromelain, a concentrate of proteolytic enzymes from the pineapple plant, is used in medicine. It is approved in the European Union for the debridement (removal of eschar, that is dead and damaged tissue) of severe burn wounds under the brand name Nexobrid. It was developed by MediWound.

The medicine has been granted orphan drug status by the European Medicines Agency (EMA).

In other contexts, bromelain has been researched for possible anti-inflammatory effects in treating a range of conditions or diseases, but results of these studies are mixed and regarded as preliminary.

In December 2022, anacaulase-bcdb (Nexobrid) was approved for medical use in the United States.

== Medical uses ==
In the United States, anacaulase gel is indicated for eschar removal in adults with deep partial thickness and/or full thickness thermal burns.

The medication is approved for burns of degrees IIb, i.e. deep partial skin thickness burns, to III, i.e. full thickness burns, and has been shown to significantly reduce the necessity of surgical debridement (15% versus 63% under standard treatment) and skin transplants (18% versus 34%) in a randomized controlled trial.

The concentrate is solved in a sterile gel basis, applied onto the burn wound, covered with a wound dressing, and removed after four hours. The healthy surrounding skin has to be protected with a sterile paraffin ointment. The EMA recommends that the treatment should be used only in hospitals having specialised burns centres.

== Contraindications and adverse effects ==
The bromelain gel is contraindicated in persons allergic to pineapple or the enzyme papain.

The most common side-effects are fever (19% of patients in studies) and local pain (3.6%). Wound infections occur no more frequently than under standard treatment.

== Interactions ==
The enzymes in NexoBrid inhibit the liver enzymes CYP2C8 and CYP2C9 when ingested. These are involved in the breaking down of a number of drugs, including amiodarone, chloroquine, ibuprofen, and warfarin. It is not known whether this mechanism has any clinical relevance.

== Pharmacokinetics ==
Depending on the surface area and depth of the wound, bromelain blood serum concentrations of no more than 40 μg/ml are expected, with peak concentrations reached after 2 to 4 hours. The terminal half-life varied between 8.5 and 19.9 hours in studies. These data have been obtained from 15 patients with comparatively shallow wounds.

== Chemistry ==
The medication is extracted from the stem of the pineapple plant (Ananas comosus) by a standardised process, and each lot has to be analysed for its chemical composition. It contains a mixture of proteolytic enzymes, the main compound being stem bromelain. Bromelain is thought to be the active ingredient, but this has not been determined in studies.

The gel basis contains water, polyacrylic acid as a gelling agent, and a disodium hydrogen phosphate/sodium hydroxide buffer.
