= Staphopain =

Identifiers
- EC no.: 3.4.22.48
- CAS no.: 347841-89-8

Databases
- IntEnz: IntEnz view
- BRENDA: BRENDA entry
- ExPASy: NiceZyme view
- KEGG: KEGG entry
- MetaCyc: metabolic pathway
- PRIAM: profile
- PDB structures: RCSB PDB PDBe PDBsum
Search
- PMC: articles
- PubMed: articles
- NCBI: proteins

Staphopain (EC 3.4.22.48, staphylopain) is an enzyme. This enzyme catalyses the following chemical reaction

Broad endopeptidase action on proteins including elastin, but rather limited hydrolysis of small-molecule substrates.

This enzyme is present in several species of Staphylococcus.
