= Stem bromelain =

Proteolytic enzyme

Identifiers
- EC no.: 3.4.22.32
- CAS no.: 37189-34-7

Databases
- IntEnz: IntEnz view
- BRENDA: BRENDA entry
- ExPASy: NiceZyme view
- KEGG: KEGG entry
- MetaCyc: metabolic pathway
- PRIAM: profile
- PDB structures: RCSB PDB PDBe PDBsum
Search
- PMC: articles
- PubMed: articles
- NCBI: proteins

Stem bromelain (SBM) (EC 3.4.22.32), a proteolytic enzyme, is a widely accepted phytotherapeutical drug member of the bromelain family of proteolytic enzymes obtained from Ananas comosus. Some of the therapeutic uses of SBM are reversible inhibition of platelet aggregation, angina pectoris, bronchitis, sinusitis, surgical traumas, thrombophlebitis, pyelonephritis and enhanced absorption of drugs, particularly of antibiotics. Its anti-metastasis and anti-inflammatory activities are apparently independent of its proteolytic activity. Although poorly understood, the diverse pleiotropic effects of SBM seem to depend on its ability to traverse the membrane barrier, a very unusual property of this protein.
