= Staphylokinase =

Class of enzymes

Identifiers
- Organism: Staphylococcus aureus
- Symbol: Sak
- UniProt: P68802
Search for
- Structures: Swiss-model
- Domains: InterPro

Staphylokinase (SAK; also known as staphylococcal fibrinolysin or Müller's factor) is a protein produced by Staphylococcus aureus. It contains 136 amino acid residues and has a molecular mass of 15kDa. Synthesis of staphylokinase occurs in late exponential phase. It is similar to streptokinase.

Staphylokinase is positively regulated by the "agr" gene regulator. It activates plasminogen to form plasmin, which digests fibrin clots. This disrupts the fibrin meshwork which forms to keep infections localized. Staphylokinase interacts with plasminogen to form a 1:1 complex that exposes the active site of the plasminogen molecule. The plasmin Sak complex is neutralized by α_{2}- antiplasmin in plasma in the absence of fibrin, resulting in lysis. However, in the presence of fibrin, the inhibition is delayed, creating a unique mechanism for fibrin selectivity in plasma.

Staphylokinase also cleaves IgG and complement component C3b, inhibiting phagocytosis.

== Structure ==
The full length of mature staphylokinase mRNA is 489bp. The first 27 amino acids code for a signal peptide which is cleaved off in the mature protein (mSak). There is little or no homology between the primary structure of Sak and other plasminogen activators. The natural variants of Sak are Sak42D, SakφC and SakSTAR. These variants have four nucleotide differences in the coding region with one silent mutation. The affected codons are amino acids 38, 61, 63 and 70 in the full length staphylokinase. Amino acid 38 is lysine, amino acid 61 is serine in SaKSTAR, glycine in SakφC, and arginine in Sak42D. Amino acid 63 is glycine in SakSTAR and SakφC, but arginine in Sak42D. SakSTAR and SakφC amino acid 70 is histidine, whereas it is arginine in Sak42D.

The mature structure of staphylokinase consists of 163 amino acids, and it is elongated in shape. Sak contains two folded domains which are of similar size. The distance from the center of gravity between the two domains is 3.7 nm. When in solution, this position varies between the two domains suggesting a flexible dumbbell shape.

== See also ==
- Fibrinolysin
