= Fruit bromelain =

Enzyme found in the fruit of the pineapple plant

Identifiers
- EC no.: 3.4.22.33
- CAS no.: 9001-00-7

Databases
- IntEnz: IntEnz view
- BRENDA: BRENDA entry
- ExPASy: NiceZyme view
- KEGG: KEGG entry
- MetaCyc: metabolic pathway
- PRIAM: profile
- PDB structures: RCSB PDB PDBe PDBsum
Search
- PMC: articles
- PubMed: articles
- NCBI: proteins

Fruit bromelain (EC 3.4.22.33, juice bromelain, ananase, Bromelase (a trademark), bromelin, extranase, pinase, pineapple enzyme, traumanase, fruit bromelain FA2) is an enzyme. This enzyme catalyses the following chemical reaction

Hydrolysis of proteins with broad specificity for peptide bonds. Bz-Phe-Val-Arg-NHMec is a good synthetic substrate

This enzyme is isolated from pineapple plant, Ananas comosus.

== See also ==
- Bromelain
