= Glutamyl endopeptidase II =

Identifiers
- EC no.: 3.4.21.82
- CAS no.: 137010-42-5

Databases
- IntEnz: IntEnz view
- BRENDA: BRENDA entry
- ExPASy: NiceZyme view
- KEGG: KEGG entry
- MetaCyc: metabolic pathway
- PRIAM: profile
- PDB structures: RCSB PDB PDBe PDBsum
Search
- PMC: articles
- PubMed: articles
- NCBI: proteins

Glutamyl endopeptidase II (EC 3.4.21.82, GluSGP) is an enzyme. This enzyme catalyses the following chemical reaction

Preferential cleavage: -Glu- >> -Asp- . Preference for Pro or Leu at P2 and Phe at P3. Cleavage of -Glu-Asp- and -Glu-Pro- bonds is slow

This enzyme is isolated from Streptomyces griseus.
