= Alpha 2-antiplasmin =

Protein-coding gene in the species Homo sapiens

SERPINF2
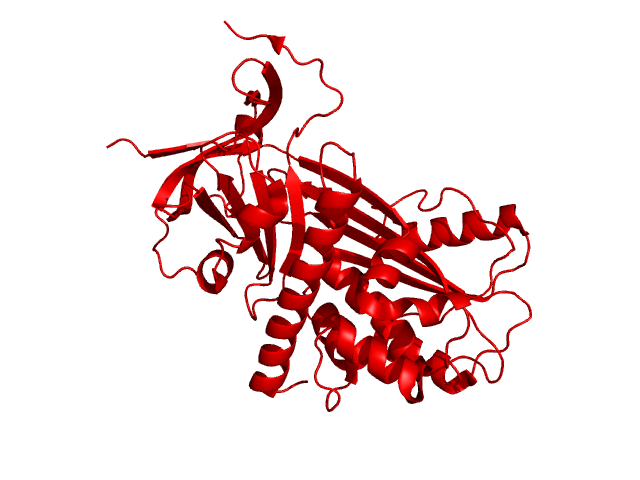

Identifiers
- Aliases: SERPINF2, A2AP, AAP, ALPHA-2-PI, API, PLI, serpin family F member 2, alpha2AP
- External IDs: OMIM: 613168; MGI: 107173; GeneCards: SERPINF2
Available structures
PDB	Ortholog search: PDBe RCSB
PDB	List of PDB id codes 2R9Y

Gene location (Human)
Chr.	Chromosome 17 (human)
Band	17p13.3	Start	1,742,836 bp
Band	17p13.3	End	1,755,265 bp

Gene location (Mouse)
Chr.	Chromosome 11 (mouse)
Band	11|11 B5	Start	75,322,558 bp
Band	11|11 B5	End	75,330,417 bp
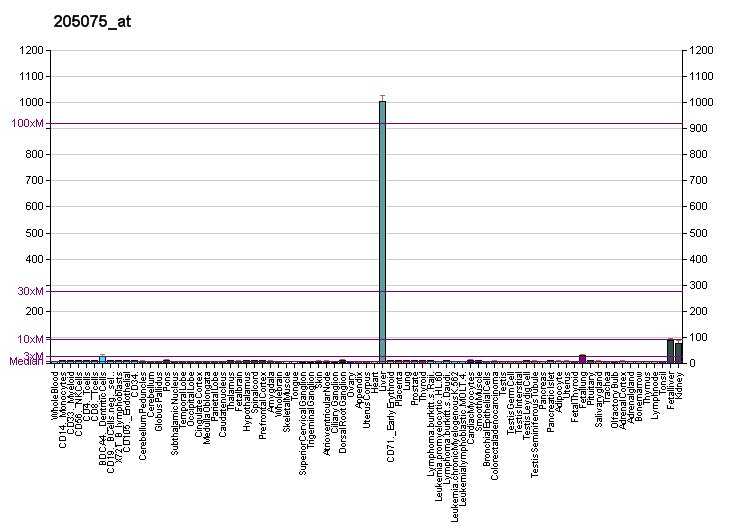
RNA expression pattern
Bgee	Human / Mouse (ortholog); Top expressed in: right lobe of liver; left uterine tube; prostate; upper lobe of left lung; human kidney; right ovary; lactiferous gland; right testis; right lobe of thyroid gland; myometrium / Top expressed in: yolk sac; liver; right kidney; proximal tubule; left lobe of liver; human kidney; gallbladder; fetal liver hematopoietic progenitor cell; abdominal wall; human fetus; More reference expression data
BioGPS	More reference expression data
Gene ontology
Molecular function	peptidase inhibitor activity; protein homodimerization activity; protease binding; protein binding; serine-type endopeptidase inhibitor activity; endopeptidase inhibitor activity
Cellular component	blood microparticle; fibrinogen complex; extracellular region; cell surface; extracellular exosome; platelet alpha granule lumen; extracellular space; collagen-containing extracellular matrix
Biological process	positive regulation of collagen biosynthetic process; negative regulation of peptidase activity; negative regulation of fibrinolysis; negative regulation of plasminogen activation; maintenance of blood vessel diameter homeostasis by renin-angiotensin; blood vessel morphogenesis; fibrinolysis; collagen fibril organization; platelet degranulation; positive regulation of JNK cascade; response to organic substance; acute-phase response; positive regulation of cell differentiation; positive regulation of ERK1 and ERK2 cascade; positive regulation of transforming growth factor beta production; positive regulation of stress fiber assembly; positive regulation of transcription by RNA polymerase II; positive regulation of smooth muscle cell proliferation; positive regulation of cell-cell adhesion mediated by cadherin; negative regulation of endopeptidase activity
Sources:Amigo / QuickGO
Orthologs
Databases	NCBI: entry; OMA: entry
Species	Human	Mouse
Entrez	5345	18816
Ensembl	ENSG00000167711; ENSG00000276838	ENSMUSG00000038224
UniProt	P08697	Q61247
RefSeq (mRNA)	NM_000934; NM_001165920; NM_001165921	NM_008878
RefSeq (protein)	NP_000925; NP_001159392; NP_001159393	NP_032904
Location (UCSC)	Chr 17: 1.74 – 1.76 Mb	Chr 11: 75.32 – 75.33 Mb
PubMed search
- Wikidata
View/Edit Human	View/Edit Mouse

Alpha 2-antiplasmin (or α_{2}-antiplasmin or plasmin inhibitor) is a serine protease inhibitor (serpin) responsible for inactivating plasmin. Plasmin is an important enzyme that participates in fibrinolysis and degradation of various other proteins. This protein is encoded by the SERPINF2 gene.

Fibrinolysis (simplified). Blue arrows denote stimulation, and red arrows inhibition.

== Structure ==
Alpha 2-antiplasmin (α2AP) is a member of the serine protease inhibitor (serpin) superfamily and is structurally characterized by a central serpin domain flanked by unique N- and C-terminal extensions. The mature human α2AP protein consists of 452 amino acids, with a 12-residue N-terminus, a central serpin domain, and a C-terminal tail of approximately 55 residues. The reactive center loop, which is crucial for its inhibitory function, protrudes from the central serpin domain and contains the Arg364-Met365 peptide bond that is specifically targeted and cleaved by plasmin. There are two main circulating forms: Met-α2AP, which has methionine at the N-terminus, and Asn-α2AP, which is N-terminally shortened and starts with asparagine; the latter form constitutes about 70% of plasma α2AP and is more efficiently cross-linked to fibrin. The C-terminal region, rich in lysine residues, mediates the initial non-covalent binding to plasmin, facilitating the formation of a stable 1:1 stoichiometric complex. This structural arrangement allows α2AP to efficiently interact with plasmin and be incorporated into fibrin clots via cross-linking by factor XIIIa.

== Function ==
Alpha 2-antiplasmin serves as the primary physiological inhibitor of plasmin, the key enzyme responsible for fibrin degradation during fibrinolysis. By rapidly forming a covalent complex with plasmin, α2AP prevents excessive breakdown of fibrin clots, thereby maintaining hemostatic balance. In addition to direct inhibition, α2AP interferes with the binding of plasminogen to fibrin, further regulating the initiation of fibrinolysis. During clot formation, α2AP is cross-linked to fibrin by activated factor XIII, which increases the resistance of the clot to lysis and enhances clot stability. This function is critical in preventing premature clot dissolution, but elevated levels of α2AP have been associated with increased risk of thrombotic events, such as stroke and myocardial infarction, due to impaired fibrinolysis. Conversely, α2AP deficiency leads to increased susceptibility to bleeding because of uncontrolled plasmin activity and rapid clot breakdown. Thus, α2AP is essential for fine-tuning the balance between clot formation and dissolution, making it a potential therapeutic target in both thrombotic and bleeding disorders.

== Clinical significance ==
Very few cases (<20) of alpha-2-antiplasmin deficiency have been described. As plasmin degrades blood clots, impaired inhibition of plasmin leads to a bleeding tendency, which was severe in the cases reported.

In liver cirrhosis, there is decreased production of alpha 2-antiplasmin, leading to decreased inactivation of plasmin and an increase in fibrinolysis. This is associated with an increased risk of bleeding in liver disease. It has been suggested, however, that the observed decreases in alpha 2-antiplasmin levels are due to a chronic state of disseminated intravascular coagulation in cirrhosis rather than defective protein synthesis.

== Interactions ==
Alpha 2-antiplasmin has been shown to interact with:

- Neutrophil elastase and
- Plasmin.

== See also ==
- Serpin
