= Bromelain =

Class of enzymes derived from pineapples

Bromelain is an enzyme extract derived from the stems of pineapples, although it exists in all parts of the fresh plant and fruit. The extract has a history of folk medicine use. As a culinary ingredient, it may be used as a meat tenderizer.

The term "bromelain" may refer to either of two protease enzymes extracted from the plants of the family Bromeliaceae, or it may refer to a combination of those enzymes along with other compounds produced in an extract.

Although tested in a variety of folk medicine and research models for its possible efficacy against diseases, the only approved clinical application for bromelain was issued in 2012 by the European Medicines Agency for a topical medication, called Nexobrid, used to remove dead tissue in severe skin burns. There is no other established application for bromelain as a nutraceutical or drug.

== Extract components ==
Stem bromelain

Identifiers
- EC no.: 3.4.22.32
- CAS no.: 37189-34-7

Databases
- BRENDA: enzyme data
- ExPASy: NiceZyme view
- KEGG: enzyme entry
- MetaCyc: metabolic pathway
- Rhea: reactions
- PDB structures: RCSB PDB PDBe PDBsum
Search
- PMC: articles
- PubMed: articles
- NCBI: proteins

Fruit bromelain

Identifiers
- EC no.: 3.4.22.33
- CAS no.: 9001-00-7

Databases
- BRENDA: enzyme data
- ExPASy: NiceZyme view
- KEGG: enzyme entry
- MetaCyc: metabolic pathway
- Rhea: reactions
- PDB structures: RCSB PDB PDBe PDBsum
Search
- PMC: articles
- PubMed: articles
- NCBI: proteins

Bromelain extract is a mixture of protein-digesting (proteolytic) enzymes and several other substances in smaller quantities. The proteolytic enzymes are sulfhydryl proteases; a free sulfhydryl group of a cysteine amino acid side chain is required for function. The two main enzymes are:

- Stem bromelain – EC 3.4.22.32
- Fruit bromelain – EC 3.4.22.33

== History ==
Pineapples have a long tradition as a medicinal plant among the natives of South and Central America. The first isolation of bromelain was recorded by the Venezuelan chemist Vicente Marcano in 1891 by fermenting the fruit of the pineapple. In 1892, Russell Henry Chittenden, assisted by Elliott P. Joslin and Frank Sherman Meara, investigated the matter more completely, and called it 'bromelin'. Later, the term 'bromelain' was introduced and originally applied to any protease from any member of the plant family Bromeliaceae.

== Sources ==
Bromelain is present in all parts of the pineapple plant (Ananas sp.), but the stem is the most common commercial source, presumably because usable quantities are readily extractable after the fruit has been harvested.

== Production ==
Produced mainly in parts of the world where pineapples are grown, such as Thailand or Malaysia, bromelain is extracted from the peel, stem, leaves or waste of the pineapple plant after processing the fruit for juice or other purposes. The starting material is blended and pressed through a filter to obtain a supernatant liquid containing the soluble bromelain enzyme. Further processing includes purification and concentration of the enzyme.

== Temperature stability ==
After an hour at 50 °C (122 °F), 83% of the enzyme remains, while at 40 °C (104 °F), practically 100% remains. The proteolytic activity of concentrated bromelain solutions remains relatively stable for at least 1 week at room temperature, and multiple freeze-thaw cycles or exposure to the digestive enzyme trypsin have little effect on it.

== Uses ==
=== Meat tenderizing and other uses ===
Along with papain, bromelain is one of the most popular proteases to use for meat tenderizing. Bromelain is sold in a powdered form, which is combined with a marinade, or directly sprinkled on the uncooked meat.

Cooked or canned pineapple does not have a tenderizing effect, as the enzymes are heat-labile and denatured in the cooking process. Some prepared meat products, such as meatballs and commercially available marinades, include pineapple or pineapple-derived ingredients.

Although the quantity of bromelain in a typical serving of pineapple fruit is probably fairly minimal, specific extraction can yield sufficient quantities for domestic and industrial processing, including uses in baking, anti-browning of cut fruit, textiles and cosmetics manufacturing.

=== Potential medical uses ===
A concentrate of proteolytic enzymes enriched in bromelain is approved in Europe for the debridement (removal of dead tissue) of severe burn wounds under the trade name NexoBrid.

Bromelain has not been scientifically proven to be effective in treating any other diseases. Bromelain-containing dietary supplements are marketed with no confirmed efficacy, safety, recommended dosage, long term safety, or adverse interaction with other medications.

== See also ==
- Phytochemicals
- Papain
