= Bandolier (journal) =

Oxford University healthcare journal

- Discipline: Healthcare
- Language: English

Publication details
- History: 1994–2010

Standard abbreviations
- ISO 4: Bandolier

Indexing
- ISSN: 1898-4436

Links
- Journal homepage

Bandolier was an independent healthcare journal about evidence-based healthcare, written by Oxford University scientists. It was started in 1994 and the National Health Service paid for its distribution to all doctors in the UK until 2002. Publication of the printed version ceased in 2007. New material was published online through 2010. Publication ceased in 2010.

In October 2016 back issues of the journal (online version) became available at its own website. It is no longer hosted on Oxford University's site.

The NHS Executive and National electronic Library for Health continue with some support for the electronic site.

== See also ==
- Cochrane Collaboration
