= Plasmin =

Enzyme in human blood that degrades clots and other proteins

PLG
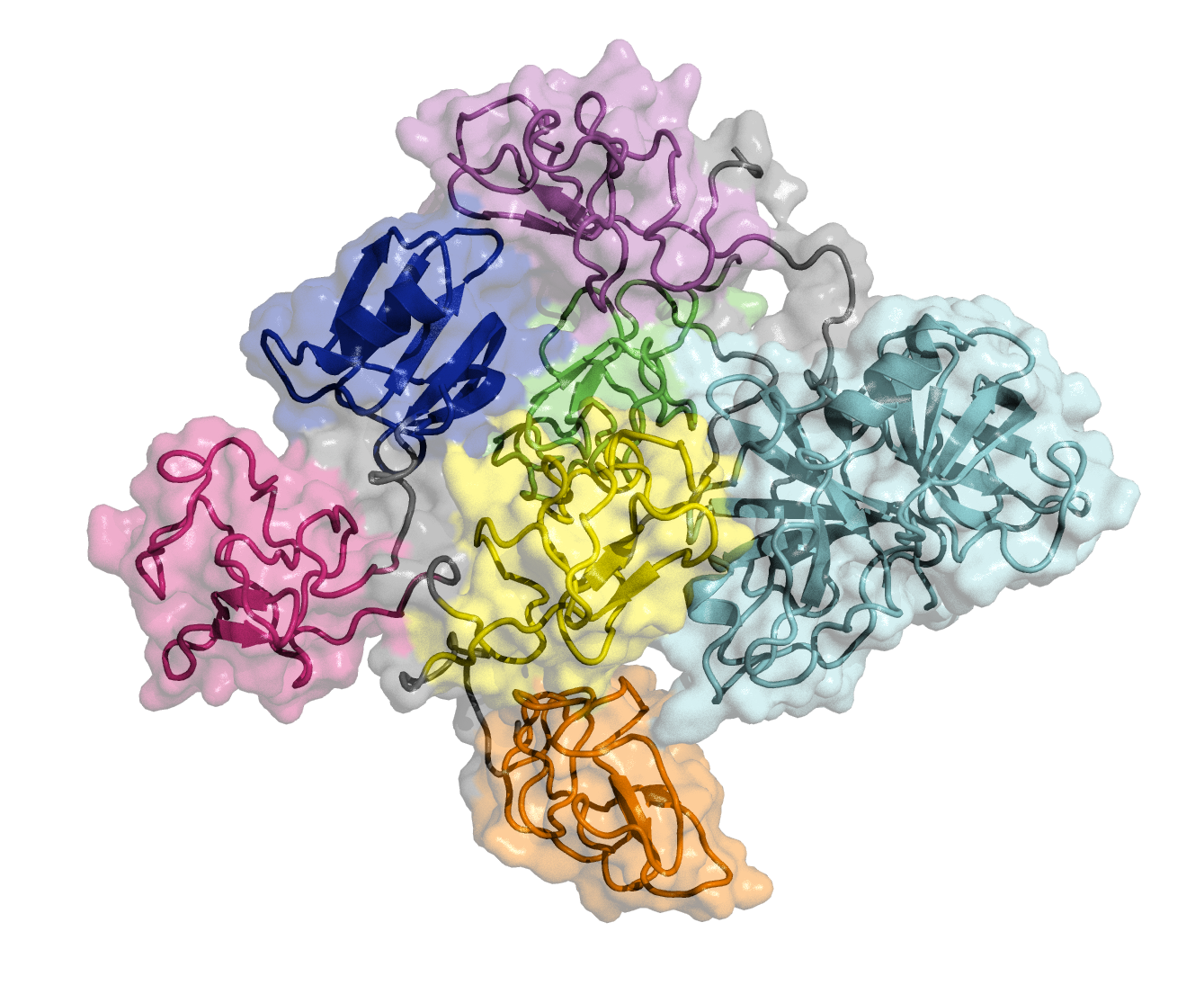

Identifiers
- Aliases: PLG, plasminogen, plasmin, HAE4
- External IDs: OMIM: 173350; MGI: 97620; GeneCards: PLG
Available structures
PDB	Ortholog search: PDBe RCSB
PDB	List of PDB id codes 1B2I, 1BML, 1BUI, 1CEA, 1CEB, 1DDJ, 1HPJ, 1HPK, 1I5K, 1KI0, 1KRN, 1L4D, 1L4Z, 1PK4, 1PKR, 1PMK, 1QRZ, 1RJX, 2DOH, 2DOI, 2KNF, 2L0S, 2PK4, 3UIR, 4A5T, 4CIK, 4DCB, 4DUR, 4DUU, 5HPG
Enzyme activity
EC #	BRENDA	ExPASy	KEGG	MetaCyc
3.4.21.7	↗	↗	↗	↗

Gene location (Human)
Chr.	Chromosome 6 (human)
Band	6q26	Start	160,702,238 bp
Band	6q26	End	160,754,097 bp

Gene location (Mouse)
Chr.	Chromosome 17 (mouse)
Band	17 A1|17 8.5 cM	Start	12,597,495 bp
Band	17 A1|17 8.5 cM	End	12,638,272 bp
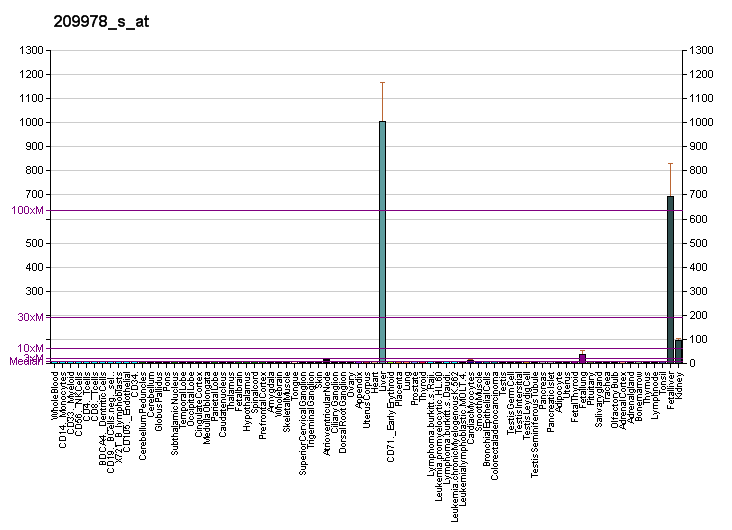

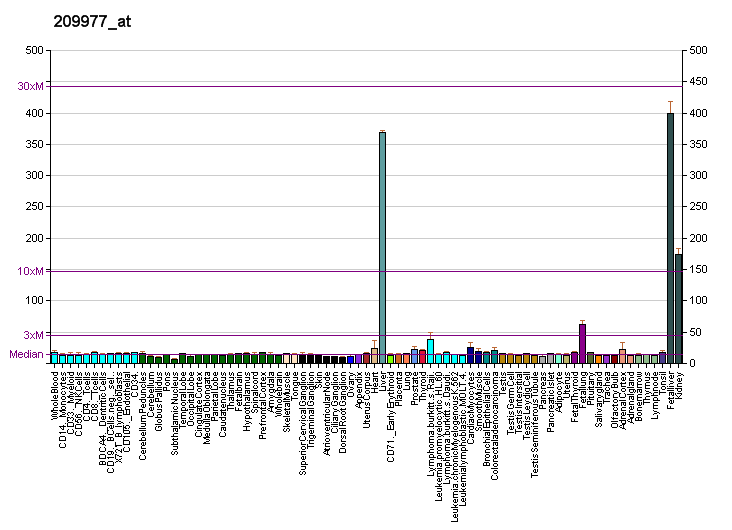

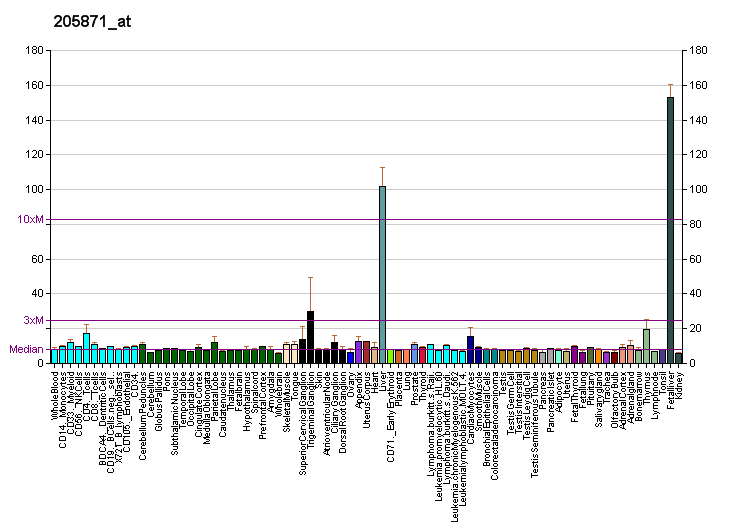
RNA expression pattern
Bgee	Human / Mouse (ortholog); Top expressed in: right lobe of liver; kidney tubule; metanephric glomerulus; human kidney; Descending thoracic aorta; ascending aorta; testicle; tibial nerve; right coronary artery; gonad / Top expressed in: left lobe of liver; gallbladder; human fetus; yolk sac; fetal liver hematopoietic progenitor cell; sexually immature organism; abdominal wall; primitive streak; embryo; thoracic diaphragm; More reference expression data
BioGPS	More reference expression data
Gene ontology
Molecular function	apolipoprotein binding; protein domain specific binding; peptidase activity; protein binding; serine-type peptidase activity; signaling receptor binding; hydrolase activity; serine-type endopeptidase activity; chaperone binding; proteasome core complex binding; protein antigen binding; endopeptidase activity; enzyme binding; kinase binding
Cellular component	blood microparticle; extracellular region; cell surface; extrinsic component of external side of plasma membrane; extracellular exosome; platelet alpha granule lumen; extracellular space; plasma membrane; extrinsic component of plasma membrane; intracellular membrane-bounded organelle; collagen-containing extracellular matrix
Biological process	hemostasis; negative regulation of cell-substrate adhesion; negative regulation of fibrinolysis; negative regulation of cell-cell adhesion mediated by cadherin; platelet degranulation; extracellular matrix disassembly; positive regulation of fibrinolysis; tissue remodeling; negative regulation of cell population proliferation; blood coagulation; proteolysis; fibrinolysis; positive regulation of blood vessel endothelial cell migration; tissue regeneration; myoblast differentiation; muscle cell cellular homeostasis; proteolysis involved in cellular protein catabolic process; trophoblast giant cell differentiation; labyrinthine layer blood vessel development; mononuclear cell migration
Sources:Amigo / QuickGO
Orthologs
Databases	NCBI: entry; OMA: entry
Species	Human	Mouse
Entrez	5340	18815
Ensembl	ENSG00000122194	ENSMUSG00000059481
UniProt	P00747	P20918
RefSeq (mRNA)	NM_001168338; NM_000301	NM_008877
RefSeq (protein)	NP_000292; NP_001161810	NP_032903
Location (UCSC)	Chr 6: 160.7 – 160.75 Mb	Chr 17: 12.6 – 12.64 Mb
PubMed search
- Wikidata
View/Edit Human	View/Edit Mouse

Plasmin is an important enzyme (EC 3.4.21.7) present in blood that degrades many blood plasma proteins, including fibrin clots. The degradation of fibrin is termed fibrinolysis. In humans, the plasmin protein (in the zymogen form of plasminogen) is encoded by the PLG gene.

== Function ==
Fibrinolysis (simplified). Blue arrows denote stimulation, and red arrows inhibition.

Plasmin is a serine protease that acts to dissolve fibrin blood clots. Apart from fibrinolysis, plasmin proteolyses proteins in various other systems: It activates collagenases, some mediators of the complement system, and weakens the wall of the Graafian follicle, leading to ovulation. Plasmin is also integrally involved in inflammation. It cleaves fibrin, fibronectin, thrombospondin, laminin, and von Willebrand factor. Plasmin, like trypsin, belongs to the family of serine proteases.

Plasmin is released as a zymogen called plasminogen (PLG) from the liver into the systemic circulation. Two major glycoforms of plasminogen are present in humans - type I plasminogen contains two glycosylation moieties (N-linked to N289 and O-linked to T346), whereas type II plasminogen contains only a single O-linked sugar (O-linked to T346). Type II plasminogen is preferentially recruited to the cell surface over the type I glycoform. Conversely, type I plasminogen appears more readily recruited to blood clots.

In circulation, plasminogen adopts a closed, activation-resistant conformation. Upon binding to clots, or to the cell surface, plasminogen adopts an open form that can be converted into active plasmin by a variety of enzymes, including tissue plasminogen activator (tPA), urokinase plasminogen activator (uPA), kallikrein, and factor XII (Hageman factor). Fibrin is a cofactor for plasminogen activation by tissue plasminogen activator. Urokinase plasminogen activator receptor (uPAR) is a cofactor for plasminogen activation by urokinase plasminogen activator. The conversion of plasminogen to plasmin involves the cleavage of the peptide bond between Arg-561 and Val-562.

Plasmin cleavage produces angiostatin.

== Mechanism of plasminogen activation ==
Full length plasminogen comprises seven domains. In addition to a C-terminal chymotrypsin-like serine protease domain, plasminogen contains an N-terminal Pan Apple domain (PAp) together with five Kringle domains (KR1-5). The Pan-Apple domain contains important determinants for maintaining plasminogen in the closed form, and the kringle domains are responsible for binding to lysine residues present in receptors and substrates.

The X-ray crystal structure of closed plasminogen reveals that the PAp and SP domains maintain the closed conformation through interactions made throughout the kringle array . Chloride ions further bridge the PAp / KR4 and SP / KR2 interfaces, explaining the physiological role of serum chloride in stabilizing the closed conformer. The structural studies also reveal that differences in glycosylation alter the position of KR3. These data help explain the functional differences between the type I and type II plasminogen glycoforms.

In closed plasminogen, access to the activation bond (R561/V562) targeted for cleavage by tPA and uPA is blocked through the position of the KR3/KR4 linker sequence and the O-linked sugar on T346. The position of KR3 may also hinder access to the activation loop. The Inter-domain interactions also block all kringle ligand-binding sites apart from that of KR-1, suggesting that the latter domain governs pro-enzyme recruitment to targets. Analysis of an intermediate plasminogen structure suggests that plasminogen conformational change to the open form is initiated through KR-5 transiently peeling away from the PAp domain. These movements expose the KR5 lysine-binding site to potential binding partners, and suggest a requirement for spatially distinct lysine residues in eliciting plasminogen recruitment and conformational change respectively.

== Mechanism of plasmin inactivation ==
Plasmin is inactivated by proteins such as α2-macroglobulin and α2-antiplasmin. The primary protein responsible for plasmin inhibition is the α2-antiplasmin which is a serpin protein. The C-terminal of the α2-antiplasmin binds plasminogen Kringle domains via lysine residues allowing for the inhibition of plasmin. Another method of plasmin inactivation involves the cleavage of an α2-macroglobulin at the bait region (a segment of the aM that is particularly susceptible to proteolytic cleavage) by plasmin. This initiates a conformational change such that the α2-macroglobulin collapses about the plasmin. In the resulting α2-macroglobulin-plasmin complex, the active site of plasmin is sterically shielded, thus substantially decreasing the plasmin's access to protein substrates. Two additional events occur as a consequence of bait region cleavage, namely (i) a h-cysteinyl-g-glutamyl thiol ester of the α2-macroglobulin becomes highly reactive and (ii) a major conformational change exposes a conserved COOH-terminal receptor binding domain. The exposure of this receptor binding domain allows the α2-macroglobulin protease complex to bind to clearance receptors and be removed from circulation.

Plasmin can also be inhibited by inhibiting its activators, inactivating PAI-1 and PAI-2 blocks the production of tPA and uPA which subsequently stop the conversion of plasminogen into plasmin. Defects in the SERPINE1 gene cause deficiencies in PA1-2.

PAI-2 is only detectable during pregnancy and lacks a signal sequence it is not secreted by the cell. Because PAI-2 is not properly secreted it accumulates in the cell where it remains unglycosylated. The exposed RCL loop on the PAI-2 contains the sequence Arg380-Thr381 which is identical to the cleavage site uPA/tPA identity. When uPA/tPA bind and cleave the bond between Arg-380 and Thr381 the RCL loop inserts itself into a β-sheet A slot in the enzyme(s) and conformationally alters the active site of the enzyme allowing it to no longer function.

== Pathology ==
Plasmin deficiency may lead to thrombosis, as the clots are not adequately degraded. Plasminogen deficiency in mice leads to defective liver repair, defective wound healing, reproductive abnormalities.

In humans, a rare disorder called plasminogen deficiency type I (Online Mendelian Inheritance in Man (OMIM): 217090) is caused by mutations of the PLG gene and is often manifested by ligneous conjunctivitis.

A rare missense mutation within the kringle 3 domain of plasminogen, resulting in a novel type of dysplasminogenemia, represents the molecular basis of a subtype of hereditary angioedema with normal C1-inhibitor; the mutation creates a new lysine-binding site within kringle 3 and alters the glycosylation of plasminogen. The mutant plasminogen protein has been shown to be a highly efficient kininogenase that directly releases bradykinin from high- and low-molecular-weight kininogen.

Plasmin is responsible for regulating certain immune processes by interacting with leukocytes, endothelial or smooth muscle cells, and the extracellular matrix, the over excessive production or high levels of plasmin may lead to acute or chronic inflammatory responses.

== Interactions ==
Plasmin has been shown to interact with Thrombospondin 1, Alpha 2-antiplasmin and IGFBP3. Moreover, plasmin induces the generation of bradykinin in mice and humans through high-molecular-weight kininogen cleavage.

Plasmin has also been implicated to play a role in mammalian reproduction noting its important in fertilization and the oocyte-sperm interaction. Studies have shown that plasmin inhibition hindered oocyte maturation and embryo development. It can also inhibit cleavage rates and blastocyst formation as well as play a key role in sperm adhesion to the oocyte.
