= Endopeptidase =

Class of enzymes

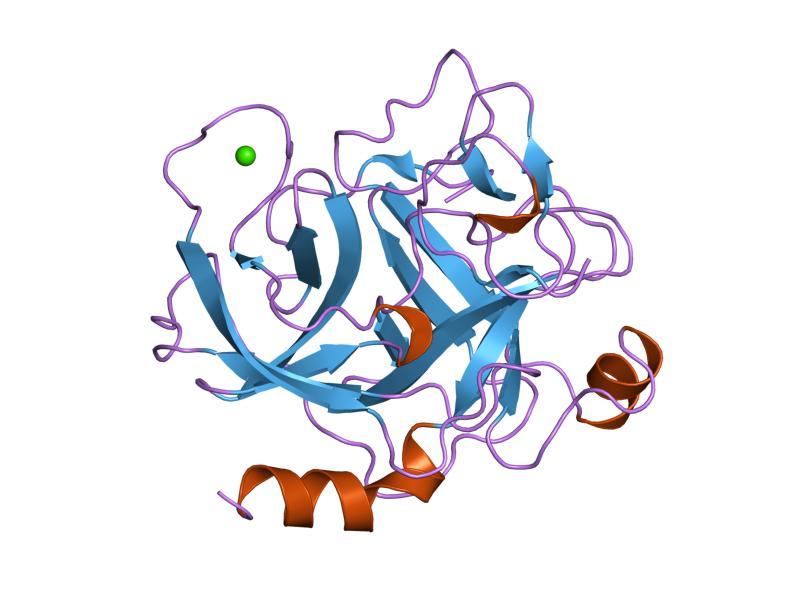

Endopeptidase or endoproteinase are proteolytic peptidases that break peptide bonds of nonterminal amino acids (i.e. within the molecule), in contrast to exopeptidases, which break peptide bonds from end-pieces of terminal amino acids. For this reason, endopeptidases cannot break down peptides into monomers, while exopeptidases can break down proteins into monomers. A particular case of endopeptidase is the oligopeptidase, whose substrates are oligopeptides instead of proteins.

They are usually very specific for certain amino acids. Examples of endopeptidases include:

- Trypsin - cuts after Arg or Lys, unless followed by Pro. Very strict. Works best at pH 8.
- Chymotrypsin - cuts after Phe, Trp, or Tyr, unless followed by Pro. Cuts more slowly after His, Met or Leu. Works best at pH 8.
- Elastase - cuts after Ala, Gly, Ser, or Val, unless followed by Pro.
- Thermolysin - cuts before Ile, Met, Phe, Trp, Tyr, or Val, unless preceded by Pro. Sometimes cuts after Ala, Asp, His or Thr. Heat stable.
- Pepsin - cuts before Leu, Phe, Trp or Tyr, unless preceded by Pro. Also others, quite nonspecific; works best at pH 2.
- Glutamyl endopeptidase - cuts after Glu. Works best at pH 8.
- Neprilysin

== See also ==
- Exopeptidase
- The Proteolysis Map
