= Hemotoxin =

Toxins that destroy red blood cells

Haemotoxins, hemotoxins or hematotoxins are toxins that destroy red blood cells, disrupt blood clotting, and/or cause organ degeneration and generalized tissue damage. Haemotoxic effects aren't limited to just animal venom: in laboratory studies, α-amanitin of the death cap mushroom (Amanita phalloides), made human blood-forming cells created in lab dishes die off, in both cultured cell lines and CD34+ stem cells partly by causing programmed cell death. The term haemotoxin is to some degree a misnomer since toxins that damage the blood also damage other tissues. Injury from a haemotoxic agent is often very painful and can cause permanent damage and in severe cases death. Loss of an affected limb is possible even with prompt treatment.

Haemotoxins are frequently employed by venomous animals, including snakes (vipers and pit vipers) and spiders (brown recluse). Animal venoms contain enzymes and other proteins that are haemotoxic or neurotoxic or occasionally both (as in the Mojave rattlesnake, the Japanese mamushi, and similar species). In addition to killing the prey, part of the function of a haemotoxic venom for some animals is to aid digestion. The venom breaks down protein in the region of the bite, making prey easier to digest.

The process by which a haemotoxin causes death is much slower than that of a neurotoxin. Snakes which envenomate a prey animal may have to track the prey as it flees. Typically, a mammalian prey will stop fleeing not because of death, but due to shock caused by the venomous bite. Symptoms are dependent upon species, size, location of bite and the amount of venom injected. In humans, symptoms include nausea, disorientation, and headache; these may be delayed for several hours.

Haemotoxins are used in diagnostic studies of the coagulation system. Lupus anticoagulant is detected by changes in the dilute Russell's viper venom time, which is a laboratory assay based on—as its name indicates—venom of the Russell's viper.
