= Chain snake =

Chain snake may refer to:

- Daboia russelii, a.k.a. the Russell's viper, a venomous viper species found in Asia
- Daboia siamensis, the Eastern Russell's viper, a venomous viper species found in Asia
- Lampropeltis g. getula, a.k.a. the eastern kingsnake, a harmless colubrid species found in the eastern United States
