= Snake venom factor V activator =

Identifiers
- EC no.: 3.4.21.95
- CAS no.: 471269-12-2

Databases
- IntEnz: IntEnz view
- BRENDA: BRENDA entry
- ExPASy: NiceZyme view
- KEGG: KEGG entry
- MetaCyc: metabolic pathway
- PRIAM: profile
- PDB structures: RCSB PDB PDBe PDBsum
Search
- PMC: articles
- PubMed: articles
- NCBI: proteins

Snake venom factor V activator (EC 3.4.21.95) is an enzyme. This enzyme catalyses the following chemical reaction

Fully activates human clotting factor V by a single cleavage at the Trp-Tyr-Leu-Arg1545-Ser-Asn-Asn-Gly bond.

This enzyme is present in venom of Daboia russelii.
