= Kaolin clotting time =

- Test of: Blood plasma

Kaolin clotting time (KCT) is a sensitive test to detect lupus anticoagulants. There is evidence that suggests it is the most sensitive test for detecting lupus anticoagulants. It can also detect factor VIII inhibitors but is sensitive to unfractionated heparin as well.

The KCT on whole blood is known as the "Activated Clotting Time" (ACT) and is widely used in various instruments during surgery such as cardiac bypass to monitor heparin.

== History ==
KCT was first described by Dr. Joel Margolis in 1958. Later on, it was found to be very sensitive to lupus anticoagulants but was only reliable when test plasmas were mixed with normal plasma in various proportions. It became the preferred method for lupus anticoagulant testing after Dr. Wilhelm Lubbe showed it to be a good marker for recurrent fetal loss.

== Principle ==
KCT is similar to the activated partial thromboplastin time test, except it does not use exogenous phospholipid. Thus, a confirmatory test that uses excess phospholipid is needed to validate the presence of lupus anticoagulants. Otherwise, diluting the test plasma in normal plasma before testing provides characteristic mixing patterns.

Kaolin is the surface activator, and the test also requires small amounts of cell fragments and plasma lipids to provide the phospholipid surface required for coagulation. Therefore, the sample quality is important for the validity of the screening test.

== Method ==
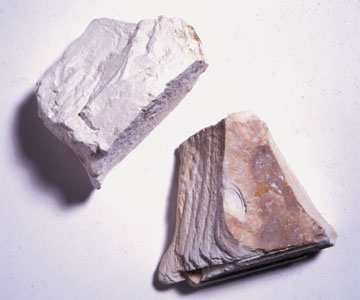
Kaolin

The test combines a test plasma with kaolin, and after a brief pre-incubation and the addition of calcium chloride, the time to clot (in seconds) is measured. Mixes of patient plasma with normal plasma are recommended for testing.

== Interpretation ==
The KCT test/control ratio of greater than or equal to 1.2 indicates that a defect is present. If the test/control ratio is between 1.1 and 1.2, the test is equivocal.

A good way of expressing the result using mixes is to calculate the Rosner index. If A is the KCT of normal plasma, B is that of the 1:1 mix and C is that of the patient plasma, then the Rosner index is 100x(B-A)/C. Values above 15 indicate a positive result but in most cases labs set their own cutoff values.

If the KCT is less than 60 seconds, this suggests that the test plasma is contaminated with platelet fragments; therefore, the test is not valid.

== See also ==
- Dilute Russell's viper venom time
- Partial thromboplastin time
- Activated clotting time
