= RVV =

RVV may stand for:

- Reeve Aleutian Airways, a defunct American airline (ICAO code)
- Russell's viper venom, used in Dilute Russell's viper venom time
- Raad van Vlaanderen, a Flemish Movement legislature during World War I
- Raad van Verzet, a Dutch resistance organisation during World War II
- Tour of Flanders, a road cycling race
- Raivavae Airport (IATA code RVV)
- RISC-V Vector Extension, vector-processing instructions for the RISC-V CPU instruction set architecture
