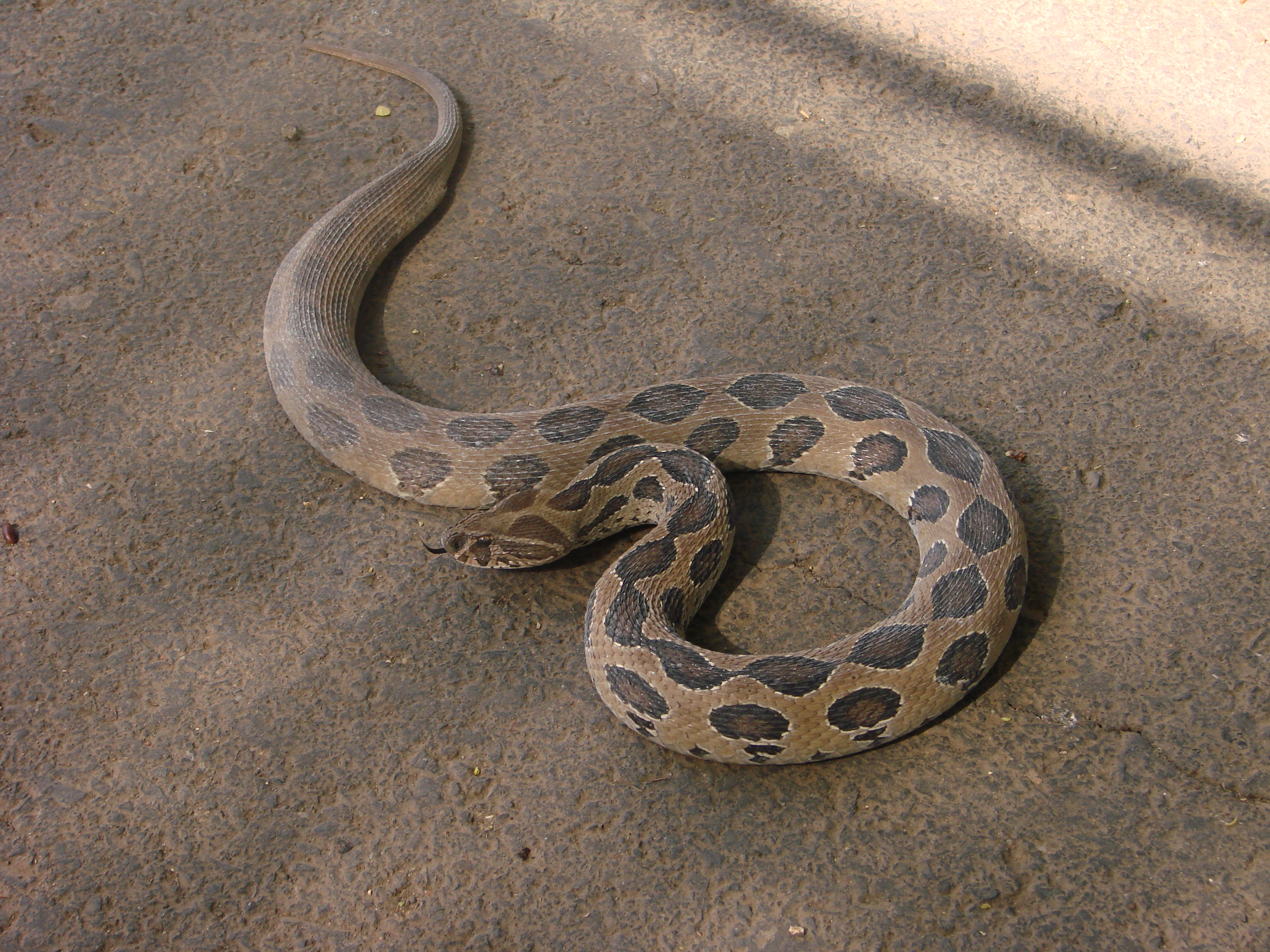

Conservation status
- Least Concern (IUCN 3.1)

Scientific classification
- Kingdom: Animalia
- Phylum: Chordata
- Class: Reptilia
- Order: Squamata
- Suborder: Serpentes
- Family: Viperidae
- Genus: Daboia
- Species: D. russelii

Binomial name
- Daboia russelii (Shaw & Nodder, 1797)
- Daboia russelii distribution

Synonyms
- Coluber russelii Shaw & Nodder, 1797; Coluber daboie Latreille In Sonnini & Latreille, 1801; Coluber trinoculus Schneider In Bechstein, 1802; Vipera daboya Daudin, 1803; Vipera elegans Daudin, 1803; Coluber triseriatus Hermann, 1804; Vipera russelii — Gray, 1831; Daboia elegans — Gray, 1842; Daboia russelii — Gray, 1842; Daboia pulchella Gray, 1842; Echidna russellii Steindachner, 1869

= Russell's viper =

Species of venomous snake

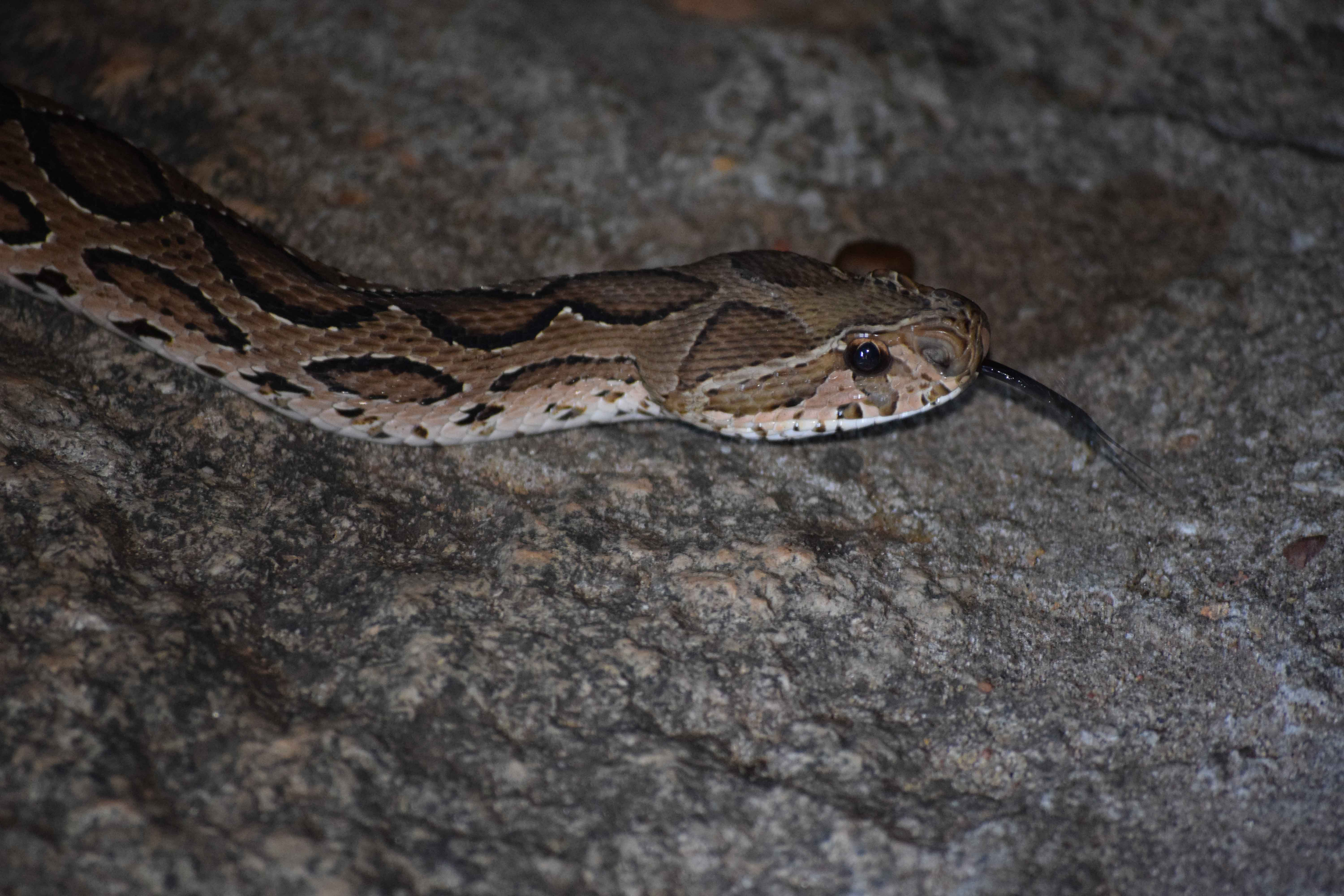
Russell's viper (Daboia russelli) in a sensing moment

Russell's viper (Daboia russelii) is a species of highly venomous snake in the family Viperidae. The species is native to South Asia. It was described in 1797 by George Shaw and Frederick Polydore Nodder. It is named after Patrick Russell. Known for its extremely painful bite, it is considered one of the "Big Four" venomous snake species in the region.

== Taxonomy ==
Coluber russelii was the name proposed by George Shaw who described the species in 1797 based on a specimen presented to the British Museum by Patrick Russell. Russell described the species in 1796 and confirmed its highly venomous nature by experimenting on chickens and dogs. He added that the native people called it katuka retula poda.

Analysis of morphological and mitochondrial DNA data shows that the eastern subspecies of Russell's viper should be considered a separate species, Daboia siamensis.

A number of other subspecies may be encountered in literature. including:

- D. s. formosensis (Maki, 1931) occurs in Thailand and is considered a synonym of D. siamensis.
- D. s. limitis (Mertens, 1927) occurs in Indonesia and is considered a synonym of D. siamensis.
- D. r. pulchella (Gray, 1842) occurs in Sri Lanka and is considered a synonym of D. russelii.
- D. r. nordicus (Deraniyagala, 1945) occurs in northern India and is considered a synonym of D. russelii.

The correct spelling of the species, D. russelii, has been, and still is, a matter of debate. Shaw and Nodder (1797), in their account of the species Coluber russelii, named it after Patrick Russell, but apparently misspelled his name, using only one "L" instead of two. McDiarmid et al. (1999) are among those who favor the original misspelling, citing Article 32c (ii) of the International Code of Zoological Nomenclature. Others, such as Zhao and Adler (1993) favor russellii.

== Etymology ==
The species is named after Patrick Russell. The genus name is thought to be a latinisation of the Hindi word daboyā meaning "that lies hid", or "the lurker".

English common names of the Russell's viper include chain viper, Indian Russell's viper, seven pacer, chain snake, and scissors snake.

== Description ==
Close up of Russells Viper (Daboia russelii)

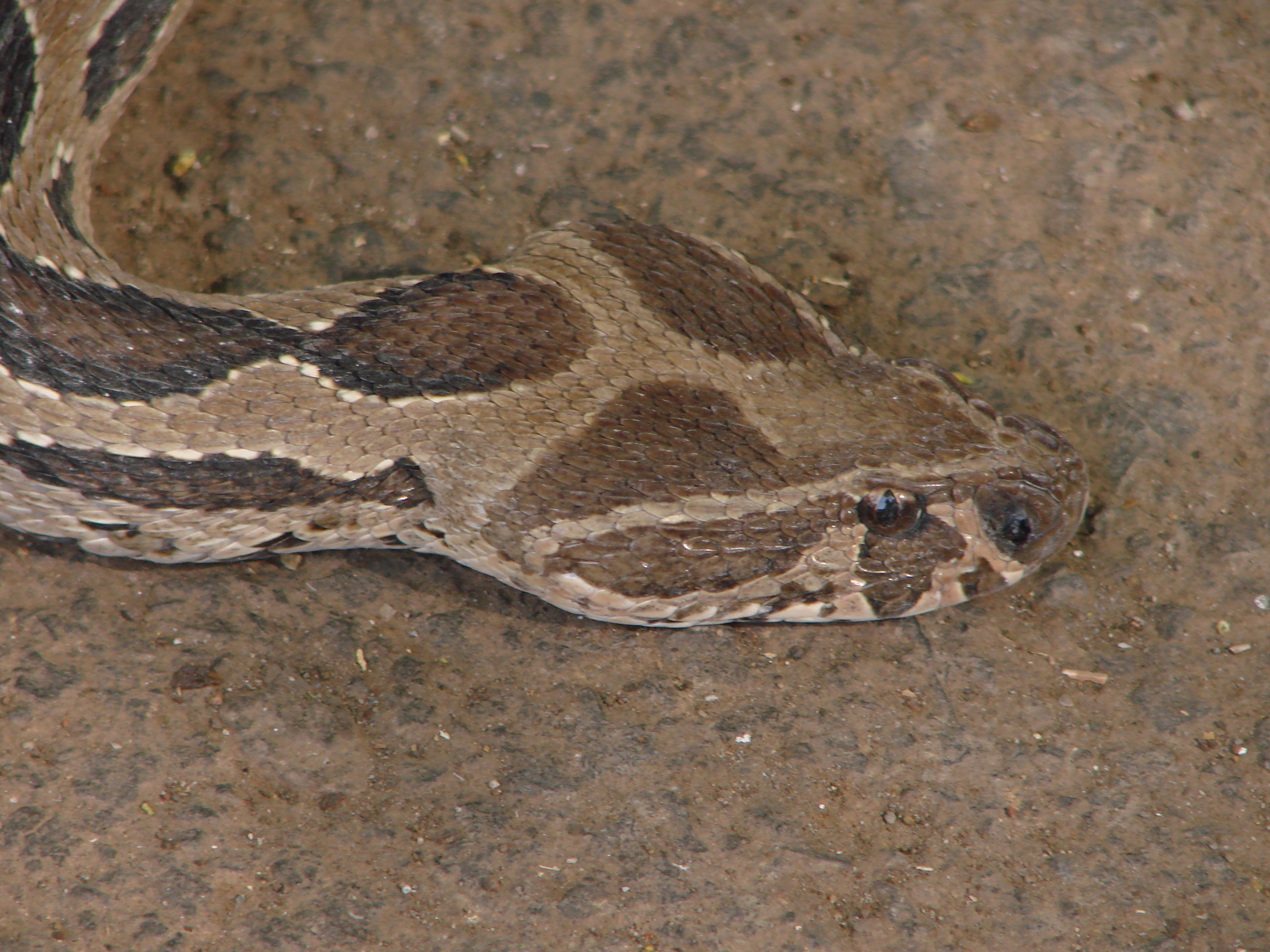
Head of Russell's viper

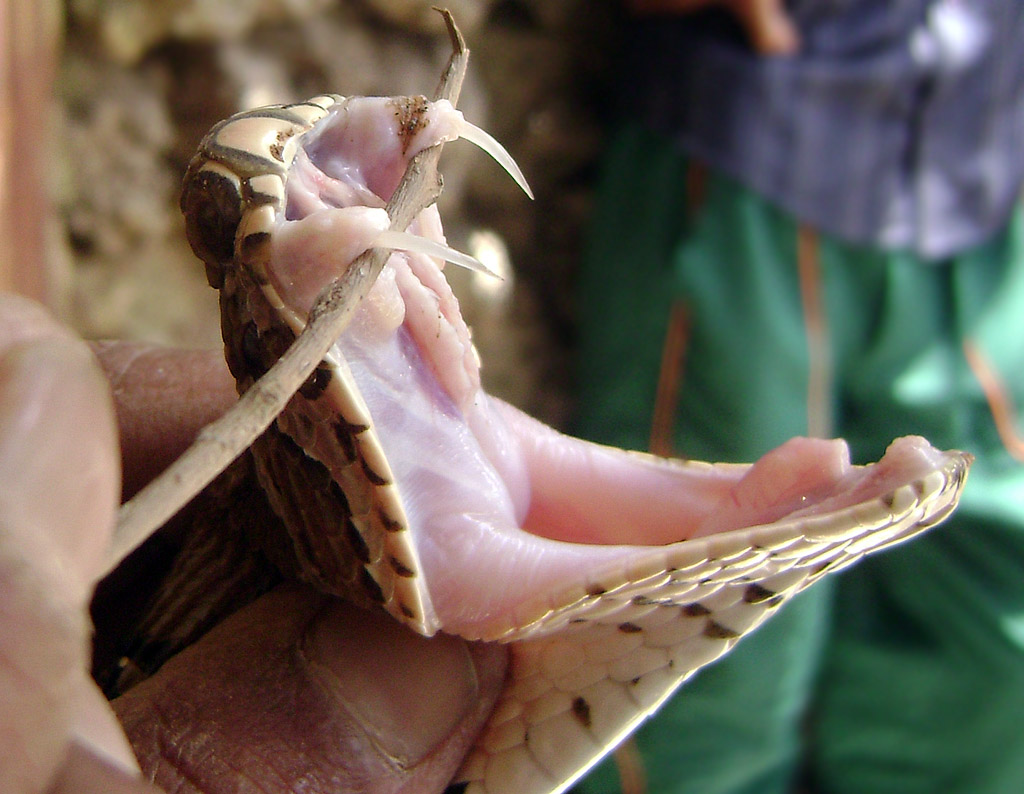
Large fangs

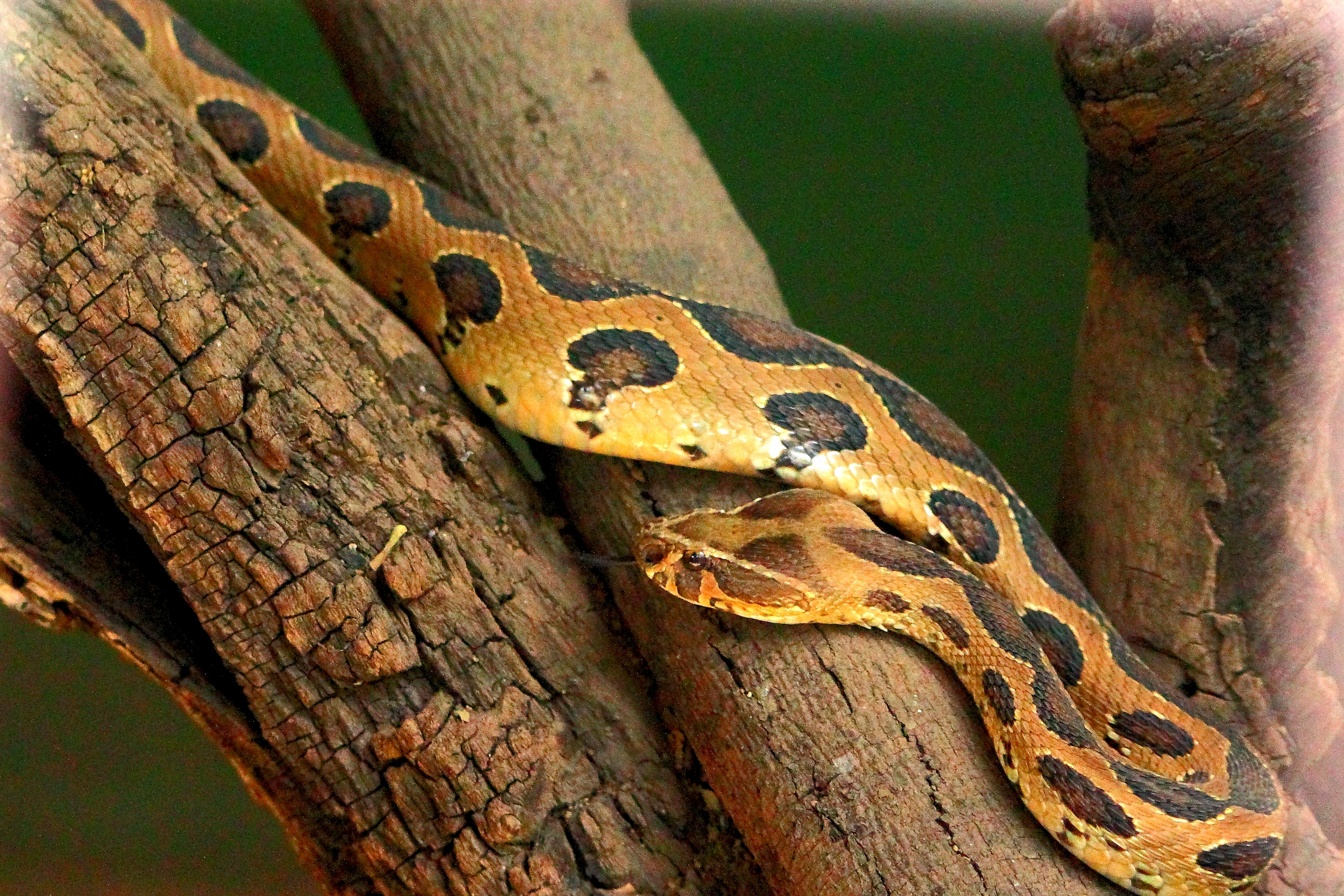
Russell's viper in Pune Zoo

The head is flattened, triangular, and distinct from the neck. The snout is blunt, rounded, and raised. The nostrils are large, each in the middle of a large, single nasal scale. The lower edge of the nasal scale touches the nasorostral scale. The supranasal scale has a strong crescent shape and separates the nasal from the nasorostral scale anteriorly. The rostral scale is as broad as it is high.

The crown of the head is covered with irregular, strongly fragmented scales. The supraocular scales are narrow, single, and separated by six to nine scales across the head. The eyes are large, flecked with yellow or gold, and surrounded by 10–15 circumorbital scales. The snake has 10–12 supralabials, the fourth and fifth of which are significantly larger. The eye is separated from the supralabials by three or four rows of suboculars. Of the two pairs of chin shields, the front pair is notably enlarged. The two maxillary bones support at least two, and at the most five or six, pairs of fangs at a time: the first are active and the rest replacements. The fangs attain a length of 16.5 mm (0.65 in) in the average specimen.

The body is stout, the cross-section of which is rounded to circular. The dorsal scales are strongly keeled; only the lowest row is smooth. Mid-body, the dorsal scales number 27–33. The ventral scales number 153–180. The anal plate is not divided. The tail is short—about 14% of the total length—with the paired subcaudals numbering 41–68.

Dorsally, the color pattern consists of a deep yellow, tan, or brown ground color, with three series of dark brown spots that run the length of the body. Each of these spots has a black ring around it, the outer border of which is intensified with a rim of white or yellow. The dorsal spots, which usually number 23–30, may grow together, while the side spots may break apart. The head has a pair of distinct dark patches, one on each temple, together with a pinkish, salmon, or brownish V or X marking that forms an apex towards the snout. Behind the eye is a dark streak, outlined in white, pink, or buff. The venter is white, whitish, yellowish, or pinkish, often with an irregular scattering of dark spots.

Russell's viper grows to a maximum body and tail length of 166 cm (65 in) and averages about 120 cm (47 in) in mainland Asia. On islands, it is slightly shorter on average. It is more slender than most vipers. The following dimensions for a "fair-sized adult specimen" were reported in 1937:

- Total length 1.24 m (4 ft 1 in)
- Length of tail 430 mm (17 in)
- Girth 150 mm (6 in)
- Width of head 51 mm (2 in)
- Length of head 51 mm (2 in)

== Distribution and habitat ==
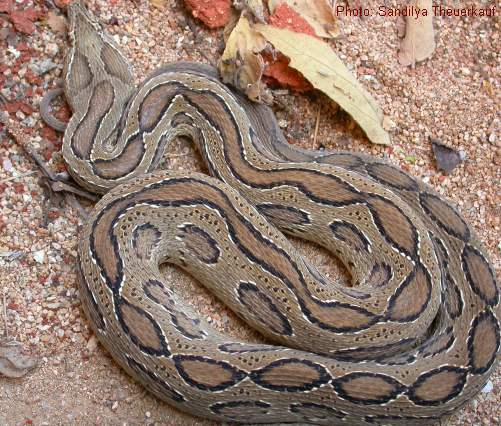

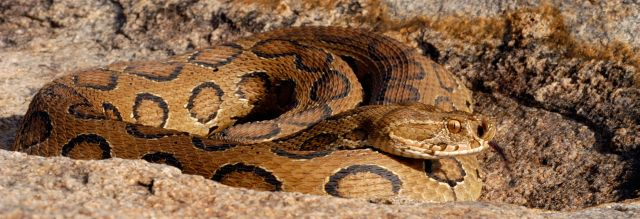
Russell's viper from India

Russell's viper is found in India, Sri Lanka, Bangladesh, Nepal, and Pakistan. Populations from South-East Asia previously assigned to this species are now considered to be part of a different species, Daboia siamensis. The type locality is listed as "India". More specifically, this would be the Coromandel Coast, by inference of Russell (1796).

Within its range, it can be common in some areas, but scarce in others. In India, it is abundant in Punjab, very common along the West Coast and its hills, and in southern India, especially in the state of Karnataka and north to Bengal. It is uncommon to rare in the Ganges valley, northern Bengal, and Assam.

Russell's viper is not restricted to any particular habitat, but does tend to avoid dense forests. The snake is mostly found in open, grassy or bushy areas, but may also be found in second growth forests (scrub jungles), on forested plantations and farmland. It is most common in plains, coastal lowlands, and hills of suitable habitat. Generally, it is not found at altitude, but has been reported as far up as 2300–3000 m (7,500–9,800 ft). Humid environments, such as marshes, swamps, and rain forests, are avoided.

This species is often found in highly urbanized areas and settlements in the countryside, the attraction being the rodents commensal with man. As a result, those working outside in these areas are most at risk of being bitten. D. russelii does not associate as closely with human habitation as Naja and Bungarus species (cobras and kraits).

== Behaviour and ecology ==
The Russell's viper is terrestrial and active primarily as a nocturnal forager. However, during cool weather, it becomes more active during the day. Adults are reported to be slow and sluggish and usually do not attack unless provoked; they can strike at lightning speed. Juveniles are generally more nervous. When threatened, they form a series of S-loops, raise the first third of the body, and produce a hiss that is supposedly louder than that of any other snake. If provoked even more, they resort to striking and can exert so much force that large individuals can lift off the ground in the process. This behaviour has often led to the misconception that the Russell's vipers "chase" and bite humans. They are strong and may react violently to being picked up. The bite may be a snap, or they may hang on for many seconds.

Although this genus does not have the heat-sensitive pit organs common to the Crotalinae, it is one of a number of viperines that are apparently able to react to thermal cues, further supporting the notion that they, too, possess a heat-sensitive organ. The identity of this sensor is not certain, but the nerve endings in the supranasal sac of these snakes resemble those found in other heat-sensitive organs.

=== Reproduction ===
Russell's viper is ovoviviparous. Mating generally occurs early in the year, although pregnant females may be found at any time. The gestation period is more than six months. Young are produced from May to November, but mostly in June and July. It is a prolific breeder. Litters of 20–40 are common, although fewer offspring may occur, as few as one. The reported maximum is 75 in a single litter. At birth, juveniles are 215–260 mm (8.5–10.2 in) in total length. The minimum total length for a gravid female is about 100 cm (39 in). It seems that sexual maturity is achieved in 2–3 years. In one case, it took a specimen nearly 4.5 hours to give birth to 11 young.

=== Prey ===
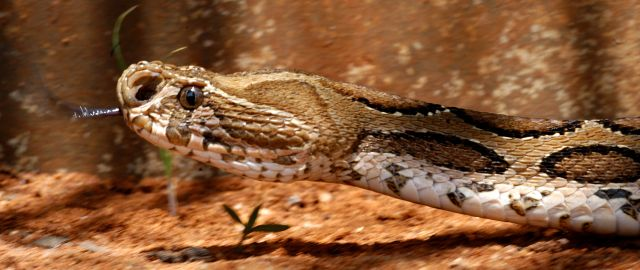
Russell's viper hunting

Russell's viper feeds primarily on rodents, although it will also eat small reptiles, land crabs, scorpions, and other arthropods. Juveniles are crepuscular, feeding on lizards and foraging actively. As they grow and become adults, they begin to specialize in rodents. Indeed, the presence of rodents and lizards is the main reason they are attracted to human habitation. Juveniles are known to be cannibalistic.

=== Mimicry ===
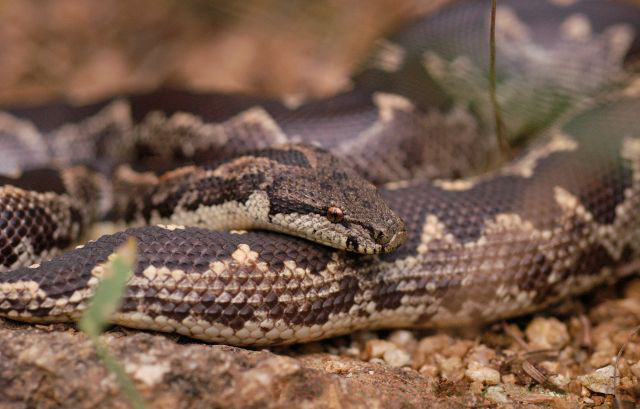
The rough-scaled sand boa Eryx conicus possibly mimics the appearance of Russell's viper

Some herpetologists believe, because D. russelii is so successful as a species and has such a fearful reputation within its natural environment, another snake has come to mimic its appearance. Superficially, the rough-scaled sand boa Eryx conicus has a color pattern that often looks like that of D. russelii, though it is completely harmless.

== Venom ==
Venom of this species is delivered by means of solenoglyphous dentition. The quantity of venom produced by individual specimens of D. russelii is considerable. Venom yields for adult specimens have been reported as 130–250 mg, 150–250 mg, and 21–268 mg. For 13 juveniles with an average total length of 79 cm (31 in), the venom yield ranged from 8 to 79 mg (mean 45 mg).

The LD_{50} in mice, which is used as a possible indicator of snake venom toxicity, is: 0.133 mg/kg intravenous, 0.40 mg/kg intraperitoneal, about 0.75 mg/kg subcutaneous. For most humans, a lethal dose is about 40–70 mg, well within the amount that can be delivered in one bite. In general, the toxicity depends on a combination of five different venom fractions, each of which is less toxic when tested separately. Venom toxicity and bite symptoms in humans vary within different populations and over time. In another study, Meier and Theakston reported that the lethality of venom of Russell viper varies with route of injection, as their results predicts the LD_{50} of 0.4 mg/kg through intraperitoneal (I.P) route, 0.75 mg/kg/subcutaneous (S.C) route and 0.3 mg/kg through intravenous (I.V) route.

=== Symptoms ===
Envenomation symptoms begin with pain at the site of the bite, immediately followed by swelling of the affected extremity. Bleeding is a common symptom, especially from the gums and in the urine, and sputum may show signs of blood within 20 minutes after the bite. The blood pressure drops, and the heart rate falls. Blistering occurs at the site of the bite, developing along the affected limb in severe cases. Necrosis is usually superficial and limited to the muscles near the bite, but may be severe in extreme cases. Vomiting and facial swelling occur in about one-third of all cases. Kidney failure (renal failure) also occurs in approximately 25–30 percent of untreated bites. Severe disseminated intravascular coagulation also can occur in severe envenomations. Early medical treatment and early access to antivenom can prevent and drastically reduce the chance of developing the severe/potentially lethal complications.

Severe pain may last for 2–4 weeks. It may persist locally, depending on the level of tissue damage. Often, local swelling peaks within 48–72 hours, involving both the affected limb and the trunk. If swelling up to the trunk occurs within 1–2 hours, envenomation is likely to be massive. Discoloration may occur throughout the swollen area as red blood cells and plasma leak into muscle tissue. Death from septicaemia or kidney, respiratory, or cardiac failure may ensue 1 to 14 days after the bite, or sometimes later.

A study in The Lancet showed that out of a sample of people who survived bites by D. russelii, 29% suffered severe damage to their pituitary glands, which later caused hypopituitarism. Other scientific studies support the hypothesis that D. russelii bites can cause hypopituitarism.

=== Antivenom treatment ===
In India, the Haffkine Institute prepares a polyvalent antivenom that is used to treat bites from this species. In late 2016, a new antivenom had been developed by the Costa Rican Clodomiro Picado Institute and clinical trials were started in Sri Lanka.

=== Clinical use ===
Because this venom is so effective at inducing thrombosis, it has been incorporated into an in vitro diagnostic test for blood clotting that is widely used in hospital laboratories. This test is often referred to as dilute Russell's viper venom time (dRVVT). The coagulant in the venom directly activates factor X, which turns prothrombin into thrombin in the presence of factor V and phospholipid. The venom is diluted to give a clotting time of 23 to 27 seconds and the phospholipid is reduced to make the test extremely sensitive to phospholipid. The dRVVT test is more sensitive than the aPTT test for the detection of lupus anticoagulant (an antibody associated with antiphospholipid syndrome), because it is not influenced by deficiencies in clotting factors VIII, IX or XI.
