= Catastrophic antiphospholipid syndrome =

- Other names: Catastrophic APS
- Specialty: Intensive care medicine, otorhinolaryngology, rheumatology

Catastrophic antiphospholipid syndrome (CAPS), also known as Asherson's syndrome, is a rare autoimmune disease in which widespread intravascular clotting causes multi-organ failure. The syndrome is caused by antiphospholipid antibodies that target a group of proteins in the body that are associated with phospholipids. These antibodies activate endothelial cells, platelets, and immune cells, ultimately causing a large inflammatory immune response and widespread clotting. CAPS was first described by Ronald Asherson in 1992. The syndrome exhibits thrombotic microangiopathy, multiple organ thromboses, and in some cases tissue necrosis and is considered an extreme or catastrophic variant of the antiphospholipid syndrome.

== Presentation ==
Clinically, the syndrome affects at least three organs and may affect many organ systems. The syndrome usually occurs with small vessel thromboses affecting organ systems such as the gastrointestinal tract and manifestations of the acute respiratory distress syndrome (ARDS), a type of systemic inflammatory response syndrome (SIRS). Peripheral thrombosis may be encountered affecting veins and arteries. Intra-abdominal thrombosis may lead to pain. The body contains β2-GPI, a glycoprotein in the blood, which is considered a natural anticoagulant due to its inhibitory effects on certain aspects of platelet synthesis and function. Because the formation of anti-β2-GPI antibodies can occur after exposure to bacteria, the body favors a hypercoagulable state, which has been noted to activate toll-like receptor 4 resulting in what is known as a cytokine storm or a thrombotic storm. A thrombotic storm may also occur due to the following precipitating events: alterations in coagulation and fibrinolysis, which induce high mortality rates, and infections amongst pediatric patients where IgM and IgG anti-β2-GPI antibodies induce an endothelial signal, leading to a procoagulant state. It is also hypothesized that thrombotic storms occur due to prothrombotic genetic risk factors, which trigger a sped-up form of thrombosis after its first occurrence, rather than being caused solely by environmental factors. Cardiovascular, nervous, kidney, and lung system complications are common. More specifically with the heart, Asherson's syndrome can lead to complications such as mitral valve regurgitation (MVR) in which the mitral valve does not shut properly allowing backflow of blood into the heart as well as angina (chest pain) and myocardial infarction (heart attack). Furthermore, complications in the kidneys may occur, including low urine production and high blood pressure, while complications with the lungs can result in rapid breathing (hyperventilation) and low oxygen levels (hypoxemia). The affected individual may exhibit skin purpura and necrosis. Cerebral manifestations may lead to encephalopathy and seizures. Myocardial infarctions may occur. Strokes may occur due to the arterial clotting involvement. Death may result from multiple organ failure.

Furthermore, the syndrome has been shown to manifest multi-organ failures and miscarriages in the context of pregnancies. 54% of pregnant mothers with the disease experienced fetal loss, and around 50% of pregnant mothers died from complications associated with the syndrome.

== Diagnosis ==
Two specific types of blood tests are used to aid in the diagnosis of Asherson's syndrome. A coagulation blood test is used to measure and determine the blood's ability to clot and how fast it takes to clot, indicating the presence of lupus anticoagulant in the blood. An enzyme-linked immunosorbent assay (ELISA) test is done to detect anticardiolipin antibodies' presence in the blood. Individuals with CAPS often exhibit a positive test to antilipid antibodies, typically IgG. Patients with high aPL (positive antiphospholipid antibodies) must have microthrombosis in multiple organs to definitively be diagnosed with CAPS—a high antilipid antibody count is not sufficient for diagnosis. To be diagnosed with CAPS, a patient must have three or more new organ thromboses developing within less than a week, and a biopsy must be later performed testing for microthrombosis in order to accurately diagnose the patient with 'definite CAPS'. If the patient has two or less new organ thromboses within a week but a biopsy still indicates the presence of microthrombosis, the patient is not considered to have CAPS. Positive test are often repeated due to the fact that antilipid antibodies can be present in the body for short stints due to infection or drug use. Along with that, individuals may or may not have a history of lupus or another connective tissue disease. Association with another disease such as lupus is called a secondary APS unless it includes the defining criteria for CAPS.

== Treatment ==
Treatments may involve the following steps:

- Prevention includes the use of antibiotics for infection and parenteral anticoagulation for susceptible patients.
- Specific therapy includes the use of intravenous heparin and corticosteroids, and possibly plasma exchanges, intravenous immunoglobulin.
- As a disease associated with high morbidity and mortality, CAPS requires an aggressive multidisciplinary treatment strategy. The following treatments have been used in various combinations: anticoagulation, glucocorticoids, plasma exchange, cyclophosphamide, intravenous immunoglobulins, and anti-platelet agents. Anticoagulation is given to stop the thrombophilic state, and it promotes the clot breakdown, while steroids downregulate the cytokine storm that is thought to be responsible for systemic inflammatory response syndrome (SIRS).
- Additional steps may have to be taken to manage circulatory problems, kidney failure, and respiratory distress.
- Recent investigational treatment therapies include high doses of Rituxan (Rituximab) and eculizumab, which are both humanized monoclonal antibodies that target B cell malignancies and prevent C5 complement cleavage, respectively.
