= Dilute Russell's viper venom time =

Laboratory test

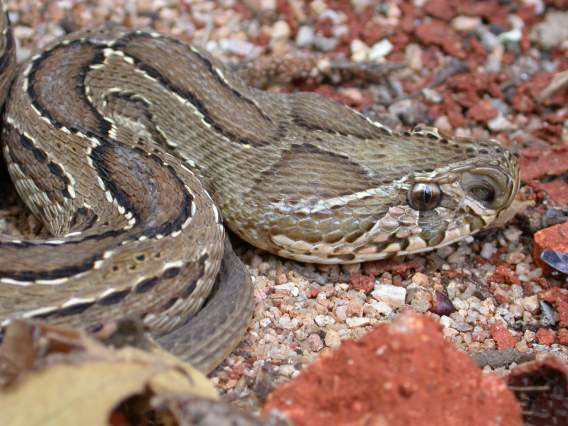
Russell's viper, Daboia russelii

Dilute Russell's viper venom time (dRVVT) is a laboratory test often used for detection of lupus anticoagulant (LA). It is an assessment of the time for blood to clot in the presence of a diluted amount of venom from Russell's viper (Daboia russelii), a highly venomous snake native to the Indian subcontinent and named after the herpetologist Patrick Russell.

== History ==
Russell's viper venom (RVV) was known to clot blood many years ago. It was widely used as a styptic to clot minor wounds when razor blades were more commonly used for shaving (e.g. "Stypven", Burroughs-Wellcome Pharma). RVV came to be useful in laboratory tests for blood clotting factors V, X, prothrombin and phospholipid.

It was first used in clotting tests for lupus anticoagulant (LA) in an individual case in 1975. The "dilute Russell's viper venom time (dRVVT)" test was then applied in 1985 to detect LA in a large number of patients and it became more widely used for this purpose. This multi-step method involved adding individual solutions of dilute phospholipid, RVV and calcium chloride to a test plasma and then measuring how long it took for the mixture to clot.

In 1989, researchers at Westmead Hospital developed a simpler assay by combining the venom, phospholipid, and calcium into a single reagent. Its first use on LA patients was reported in 1990. It was commercialized as "LA Screen" by Gradipore Ltd, Sydney (later Life Diagnostics) and distributed widely by American Diagnostica Inc (New York) as "dVVTest".

The reagent was improved in 1992 by making it resistant to the widely used interfering anticoagulant heparin. A new LA resistant version with increased phospholipid was also released at that time. This was introduced as "LA-Confirm" by Gradipore and "dVVConfirm" by American Diagnostica. Results with this high phospholipid reagent were not prolonged by most LA, but remained similarly affected as in the "screen" test by all other variables in test plasmas (Gradipore product information). The combination of screening and confirmatory dRVVT reagents made identification of LA more simple. Manufacture of these reagents has since passed on to the major diagnostic companies such as Diagnostica Stago, Precision Biologic, and IL/Werfen.

== Mechanism ==
The dRVVT assay relies on the venom of the Russelli viper. The venom contains enzymes (RVV-X) that directly activates clotting factor X (bypassing intrinsic and extrinsic cascades). In the presence of calcium and phospholipids, these factors convert prothrombin into thrombin, leading to fibrin clot formation. The assay uses low concentrations of venom and phospholipids, resulting in a standard clotting time of 35 to 37 seconds. The test has three phases: In screening phase a lower phospholipid quantity is used (35–37 seconds clotting time) to enhance sensitivity to lupus anticoagulant. In confirmatory phase full phospholipid dose (30–35 seconds clotting time) helps validate results. In a mixing study, the patient plasma is mixed with normal pooled plasma (NPP) in a 1:1 ratio to assess clotting factor deficiency. If clotting time prolongs during screening, lupus antibodies may be present. Mixing study differentiates between lupus antibodies and factor deficiency. Excess phospholipids in the confirmatory phase shorten clotting time if lupus antibodies are present.

== Interpretation ==
Through the three phases, following ratios are calculated which help interpret the diagnosis:

i) dRVVT screen ratio (LA1R): Patient plasma with LA1 reagent/NPP
ii) dRVVT confirm ratio (LA2R): Patient plasma with LA2 reagent/NPP
iii) Screen Normalized Ratio (Screen NR): LA1R/LA2R
iv) LA1 Mix Ratio (LA1MR): 50:50 mix of patient plasma & NPP using LA1/NPP
v) LA2 Mix Ratio (LA2MR): 50:50 mix of patient plasma & NPP using LA2/NPP
vi) Mix Normalized Ratio (Mix NR): LA1MR/LA2MR

By using these ratios and analyzing the possible result combinations, the test's interpretation and reporting are conducted.

dRVVT Interpretation/Algorithm
Patient Plasma			Mixing Studies			Interpretation
Screen Ratio (LA1R)	Confirm Ratio (LA2R)	Screen NR (LA1R/LA2R)	LA1 Mix Ratio (LA1MR)	LA2 Mix Ratio (LA2MR)	Mix NR (LA1MR/LA2MR)	Interpretation
<1.2	Not required	Not required	Not required	Not required	Not required	Negative
≥1.2	<1.20	<1.20	Not required	Not required	Not required	LA not detected
≥1.2	<1.20	≥1.20 – 1.49	Not required	Not required	Not required	Weak LA Positive
≥1.2	<1.20	≥1.5 – 2.00	Not required	Not required	Not required	Moderate LA Positive
≥1.2	<1.20	>2.00	Not required	Not required	Not required	Strong LA Positive
≥1.2	≥1.2	Not required	<1.20	Not required	Not required	LA not detected. Exclude clotting factor deficiency or vitamin K antoginist therapy
≥1.2	≥1.2	Not required	≥1.2	<1.20	<1.20	LA not detected
≥1.2	≥1.2	Not required	≥1.2	<1.20	≥1.20 – 1.49	Weak LA Positive
≥1.2	≥1.2	Not required	≥1.2	<1.20	≥1.5 – 2.00	Moderate LA Positive
≥1.2	≥1.2	Not required	≥1.2	<1.20	>2.00	Strong LA Positive
≥1.2	≥1.2	Not required	≥1.2	≥1.2	Not required	Unsuitable for reporting due to the presence of another inhibitor like heparin or strong LA. Repeat after stopping anticoagulant therapy

Additional calculations are made using percentage correction of dRVVT and normalized percentage correction as under:

i) Percentage correction = [Patient Screen dRVVT/Patient confirm dRVVT] x 100
ii) Normalized percentage correction = [(dRVVT screen ratio − dRVVT confirm ratio) /dRVVT screen ratio] × 100

Normalized percentage correction of >10% is taken as positive and suggests the presence of lupus anticoagulant.

== Limitations ==
dRVVT tests are strongly affected by the new direct oral anticoagulants (DOACs) and false positive LA results are obtained particularly with rivaroxaban. It is now possible to specifically remove DOACs from test plasmas with activated carbon and enable the correct diagnosis of LA with the dRVVT system despite their initial presence.

== Use in diagnosis ==
The dRVVT is one component of a workup of a suspected antiphospholipid antibody, the other component being the serological testing for anticardiolipin antibodies and anti-β2 glycoprotein-I antibodies using ELISA technology. The Sapporo criteria require at least one of the above laboratory tests to be positive and the patient to have at least one clinical manifestation of antiphospholipid syndrome, such as vascular thrombosis or fetal mortality/morbidity, in order to diagnose the antiphospholipid syndrome. Positive laboratory test results should be seen on two occasions at least 12 weeks apart in order for diagnosis. Antiphospholipid antibody syndrome is an important marker for recurrent thrombosis, and often warrants indefinite anticoagulant (blood thinner) therapy. Warfarin appears to be preferable to DOACs as the latter have recently been found less effective than expected.

The criteria were defined in 1999, and revised in 2006.
