= Lupus (journal) =

- Discipline: Clinical medicine
- Language: English
- Edited by: Graham R. V. Hughes

Publication details
- History: 1991–present
- Publisher: SAGE Publishing
- Frequency: Monthly
- Impact factor: 2.911 (2020)

Standard abbreviations
- ISO 4: Lupus

Indexing
- ISSN: 0961-2033 (print); 1477-0962 (web)
- LCCN: 92033150
- OCLC no.: 645296909

Links
- Journal homepage; Online access; Online archive

Lupus is a peer-reviewed academic journal that publishes papers in the field of rheumatology. The journal's editor is Graham R. V. Hughes (King's College London). It has been in publication since 1991 and is currently published by SAGE Publishing.

== Scope ==
Lupus is devoted exclusively to Lupus and related disease research. The journal includes new, clinical and laboratory-based studies from specialists in lupus-related disciplines such as rheumatology, dermatology and immunology.

== Abstracting and indexing ==
Lupus is abstracted and indexed in, among other databases: Scopus, and the Social Sciences Citation Index. According to the Journal Citation Reports, its 2010 impact factor is 2.600, ranking it 14 out of 29 journals in the category 'Rheumatology'.
