= C. Lockard Conley =

American hematologist (1915–2010)

- Born: May 14, 1915; Baltimore, Maryland
- Died: January 30, 2010 (aged 94); Catonsville, Maryland
- Occupation: Physician
- Known for: Hematology research and teaching

Carroll Lockard "Lock" Conley (May 14, 1915 – January 30, 2010) was a hematologist and founder of the Division of Hematology at the Johns Hopkins School of Medicine.

== Early life and education ==
Conley was born in Baltimore, Maryland. His father owned The Leib Packing Co., an oyster packing firm, and his mother was a homemaker. He attended Forest Park High School, graduating in 1931. He then attended Johns Hopkins University, graduating with a degree in biology. He attended the University of Maryland School of Medicine, then transferred to the Columbia University College of Physicians and Surgeons, receiving his M.D. degree in 1940. He interned at NewYork–Presbyterian Hospital, then entered the U.S. Army Medical Corps, serving throughout World War II and leaving the Army with the rank of major.

== Career ==
He joined the faculty of Johns Hopkins Medical School in 1946, and the next year he was appointed head of the newly formed Division of Hematology. He was appointed a full professor in 1956 and a Distinguished Professor of Medicine in 1976. He remained at Hopkins until his retirement in 1980. He then was appointed distinguished senior clinician at the U.S. Public Health Service Hospital in Baltimore, where he established a teaching program for medical students. He retired from that position in 1987.

His hematology research included important work on blood coagulation, blood platelets, hemorrhagic diseases, and hemoglobins. He made significant contributions to developing a therapy for vitamin B-12 deficiency. In 1947 he discovered and described lupus anticoagulants. In 1953 he and a research fellow, Ernest W. Smith, described a simple method of separating the components of hemoglobin on filter paper using electrophoresis, which made hemoglobin analysis far more widely available and facilitated the study and treatment of sickle cell anemia. In his studies of sickle cell anemia he followed some patients for 40 years.

He was universally described as an inspiring teacher, and many of his students and fellows went on to become university chancellors, medical department chairs, and heads of hematology divisions. When he retired in 1980, a whole issue of the Johns Hopkins Medical Journal was devoted to him, consisting entirely of articles by his former students. In 2002 Sir David Weatherall and three other former students dedicated their book Haematology to Conley, of whom Weatherall said “Of all the remarkable physicians with whom I have had the privilege of associating over the years, I can think of no one who had more influence on the way I came to think about patient care and medical research.”

He served as president of the American Society of Hematology in 1976.

== Personal ==
He was married to the former Edith Martina DeYoung, a registered nurse, for 62 years until her death in 2005. They had two daughters.

== Recognition ==
- The American College of Physicians honors his skill as a teacher by awarding an annual C. Lockard Conley, M.D. Award for Excellence in Medical Resident Education.
- The C. Lockard Conley Fellowship Award in Hematology is given to a medical student at Johns Hopkins Medical School.
- His collected papers are housed at the Medical Archives of the Johns Hopkins Medical Institutions.
