= Anti-apolipoprotein antibodies =

Autoantibody
Anti-Apolipoprotein, β-_{2} Glycoprotein 1
Autoantigen; Isoform	Apolipoprotein H
Autoantigen gene	APOH
Affected organ(s)	Cardiovascular
Affected tissue(s)	serum
Affected cell(s)	blood platelets
Also Affected	serum proteins
Associated; Disease(s)	Idiopathic Thrombosis, Sclerosis, Systemic lupus erythematosus Antiphospholipid syndrome
	DR4-DQ3
HLA associations	DR53
	DRB1*0402 (DR4)

In autoimmune disease, anti-apolipoprotein H (AAHA) antibodies, also called anti-β_{2} glycoprotein I antibodies, comprise a subset of anti-cardiolipin antibodies and lupus anticoagulant. These antibodies are involved in sclerosis and are strongly associated with thrombotic forms of lupus. As a result, AAHA are strongly implicated in autoimmune deep vein thrombosis.

Also, it was proposed that AAHA is responsible for lupus anticoagulant. However, antiphospholipid antibodies bind phospholipids at sites similar to sites bound by anti-coagulants such as PAP1 sites and augment anti-coagulation activity. This contrasts with the major, specific, activity of AAHA, defining a subset of anti-cardiolipin antibodies that specifically interacts with Apo-H. AHAA only inhibits the anti-coagulation activity in the presence of Apo-H and the AAHA component of ACLA correlates with a history of frequent thrombosis. This can be contrasted with lupus anticoagulant which inhibits agglutination in the presence of thrombin. A subset of AHAA appear to mimic the activity of lupus anticoagulant and increase Apo-H binding to phospholipids. These two activities can be differentiated by the binding to Apo-H domains, whereas binding to the 5th domain promotes that anti-coagulant activity binding to the more N-terminal domains promotes lupus anticoagulant-like activities.

AAHA interferes with factor Xa inhibition by Apo-H increasing factor Xa generation. However, like Apo-H the Lupus anticoagulant inhibits factor Xa generation.

AAHA also inhibited the autoactivation of factor XII while at high AAHA concentrations, factor XIIa activation increases at levels comparable to Apo-H that cause inhibition of factor XIIa activation. A synchronized inhibition of factor XII autoactivation by Apo-H and AHAA has been suggested.

== Genetics ==
The haplotype HLA-DR4-DQ3 appears to play a role in the pathogenic AAHA production. The alleles primarily recognized are HLA-DR53 (DRB4*01), DRB1*0402, DQA1*03, and possibly DQB1*0302. All of these alleles are in linkage disequilibrium in the DRB4*01:DRB1*0402:DQA1*0301:DQB1*0302 haplotype, also called DR4-DQ8 and also the DQA1:0303:DQB1*0301 haplotype, DR4-DQ7.3. However, in European Americans which reflects a broad area of Europe in which the original studies were conducted only DR4(0402)-DQ8 was found, indicating that the entire haplotype is involved.

HLA-DR7 may also be associated with these antibodies and the common haplotype association is the HLA-DR53 serotype.
