= Lupus anticoagulant =

- Other names: Lupus antibody, LA, LAC, lupus inhibitors

Lupus anticoagulant is an immunoglobulin that binds to phospholipids and proteins associated with the cell membrane. Its name is a partial misnomer, as it is actually a prothrombotic antibody in vivo. The name derives from their properties in vitro, as these antibodies increase coagulation times in laboratory tests such as the activated partial thromboplastin time (aPTT). Investigators speculate that the antibodies interfere with phospholipids used to induce in vitro coagulation. In vivo, the antibodies are thought to interact with platelet membrane phospholipids, increasing adhesion and aggregation of platelets, which accounts for the in vivo prothrombotic characteristics.

The condition was first described by hematologist C. Lockard Conley in 1952.

== Terminology ==
Both words in the term "lupus anticoagulant" can be misleading:

- Most patients with a lupus anticoagulant do not actually have lupus erythematosus, and only a small proportion will proceed to develop this disease (which causes joint pains, skin problems and kidney failure, amongst other complications). People with lupus erythematosus are more likely to develop a lupus anticoagulant than the general population.
- The term "anticoagulant" accurately describes its function in vitro. However in vivo, it functions as a procoagulant. The "lupus anticoagulant paradox" may be explained by platelet activation as described above, as well as enhancement of activated protein C resistance and suppression of the anticoagulant activity of TFPIα. Another proposed mechanism is the antibody-mediated destruction of Annexin A5 on the membranes of endothelial cells and trophoblast cells.

== Indications for testing ==
The main indication for testing for lupus anticoagulant is a suspected antiphospholipid syndrome, whose main manifestations are blood clots (thrombosis) in both arteries and veins as well as pregnancy-related complications such as miscarriage, stillbirth, preterm delivery, and severe preeclampsia.

In a suspected antiphospholipid syndrome, lupus anticoagulant is generally tested in conjunction with anti-apolipoprotein antibodies and anti-cardiolipin antibodies, and diagnostic criteria require one clinical event (i.e. thrombosis or pregnancy complication) and two positive blood test results spaced at least three months apart that detect at least one of the three types of antibodies.

Testing for lupus anticoagulant can also be indicated by a prolonged aPTT test that is unexplained.

== Workup ==
An aPTT is generally included in a differential diagnosis in vague symptoms, and is a non-specific test of coagulation. In contrast, the prothrombin time (PT), another non-specific coagulation test, is normally unaffected by lupus anticoagulant. Nevertheless, falsely increased PT has been reported, likely by lupus anticoagulant interfering with the phospholipid component of the PT reagent, particularly when using recombinant tissue factor and purified phospholipids.

A mixing test is generally in the initial workup of a prolonged aPTT. In a mixing test, patient plasma is mixed with normal pooled plasma and the clotting is reassessed. If a clotting inhibitor such as a lupus anticoagulant is present, the inhibitor will interact with the normal pooled plasma and the clotting time will generally remain abnormal. However, if the clotting time of the mixed plasma corrects towards normal, the presence of an inhibitor such as the lupus anticoagulant is less likely, instead indicating a deficient quantity of clotting factor (that is replenished by the normal plasma). In case of a corrected mixing test, a lower dose of normal pooled plasma is often used, such as a 4:1 mix (4 times as much patient plasma than normal pooled plasma), as some studies suggest that this method is more sensitive for the detection of a weak lupus anticoagulant that is not enough prevalent or potent to affect a 1:1 mix.

However, only about 60 per cent of patients with lupus anticoagulants have a both a prolonged APTT and APTT mix, making it unsuitable as the only test in case of a high suspicion of the antiphospholipid syndrome. Thus, one or more of the following tests are generally performed to detect lupus anticoagulant if a high suspicion remains, and/or specify lupus anticoagulant as the cause of an abnormal mixing test:

- Phospholipid-sensitive functional clotting testing, such as the dilute Russell's viper venom time, Kaolin clotting time, or silica clotting time. As a further confirmation, a second test with the addition of excess phospholipid will correct the prolongation (conceptually known as "phospholipid neutralization"), confirming the diagnosis of a lupus anticoagulant.
- Lupus-sensitive aPTT, of which many variants exist, but have the common feature of having a greater sensitivity of becoming prolonged in the presence of lupus anticoagulant compared to a regular aPTT.
- Hexagonal (II) phase phospholipid neutralization, wherein such phospholipids specifically neutralize lupus anticoagulant, so a normalization of aPTT after adding it specifically indicates the presence lupus anticoagulants.

Guidelines for lupus anticoagulant testing have been issued by the ISTH, CLSI, and the British Committee for Standards in Haematology. The result may be reported as a ratio used to identify the cutoff. A ratio of 1.2 is commonly used, such that a value <1.2 indicates the absence of a lupus anticoagulant, while a value >1.2 indicates the presence of a lupus anticoagulant. Direct oral anticoagulants and vitamin K antagonists used to treat thrombosis can interfere with lupus anticoagulant assays and generate either false-positive or false-negative findings.

== Treatment ==
Treatment for a lupus anticoagulant is usually undertaken in the context of documented thrombosis, such as extremity phlebitis or dural sinus vein thrombosis. Patients with a well-documented (i.e., present at least twice) lupus anticoagulant and a history of thrombosis should be considered candidates for indefinite treatment with anticoagulants. Patients with no history of thrombosis and a lupus anticoagulant should probably be observed. Current evidence suggests that the risk of recurrent thrombosis in patients with an antiphospholipid antibody is enhanced whether that antibody is measured on serological testing or functional testing. The Sapporo criteria specify that both serological and functional tests must be positive to diagnose the antiphospholipid antibody syndrome.

Miscarriages may be more prevalent in patients with a lupus anticoagulant. Some of these miscarriages may potentially be prevented with the administration of aspirin and unfractionated heparin. The Cochrane Database of Systematic Reviews provide a deeper understanding on the subject. For refractory cases, hydroxychloroquine may be considered.

Thrombosis is treated with anticoagulants (LMWHs and warfarin).
