= Apolipoprotein H =

Protein-coding gene in humans

APOH

Identifiers
- Aliases: APOH, B2G1, B2GP1, BG, apolipoprotein H
- External IDs: OMIM: 138700; MGI: 88058; GeneCards: APOH
Available structures
PDB	Ortholog search: PDBe RCSB
PDB	List of PDB id codes 1C1Z, 1G4F, 1G4G, 1QUB, 2KRI, 3OP8, 4JHS

Gene location (Human)
Chr.	Chromosome 17 (human)
Band	17q24.2	Start	66,212,033 bp
Band	17q24.2	End	66,256,525 bp

Gene location (Mouse)
Chr.	Chromosome 11 (mouse)
Band	11 E1|11 71.8 cM	Start	108,234,180 bp
Band	11 E1|11 71.8 cM	End	108,305,222 bp
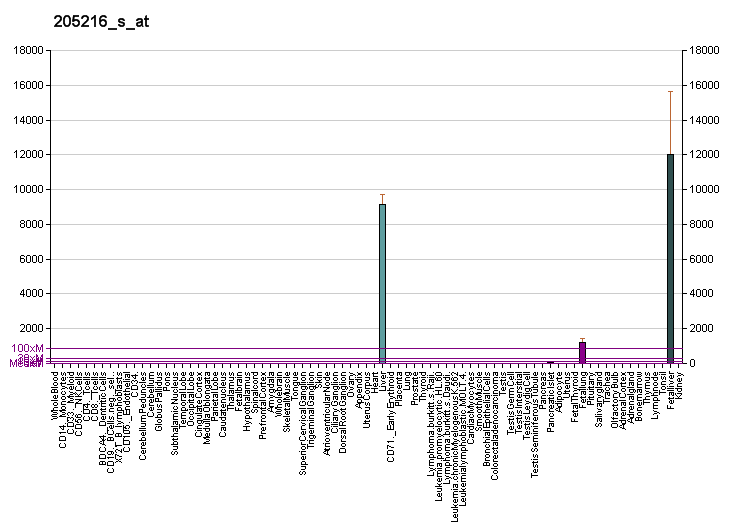
RNA expression pattern
Bgee	Human / Mouse (ortholog); Top expressed in: liver; right lobe of liver; kidney tubule; testicle; islet of Langerhans; gonad; glomerulus; metanephric glomerulus; pancreatic epithelial cell; body of pancreas / Top expressed in: left lobe of liver; gallbladder; fetal liver hematopoietic progenitor cell; spermatid; human fetus; seminiferous tubule; sexually immature organism; proximal tubule; spermatocyte; right kidney; More reference expression data
BioGPS	More reference expression data
Gene ontology
Molecular function	heparin binding; lipoprotein lipase activator activity; protein binding; identical protein binding; phospholipid binding; lipid binding
Cellular component	extracellular matrix; chylomicron; very-low-density lipoprotein particle; high-density lipoprotein particle; extracellular exosome; platelet dense granule lumen; extracellular space; cell surface; extracellular region; collagen-containing extracellular matrix
Biological process	blood coagulation, intrinsic pathway; negative regulation of fibrinolysis; negative regulation of blood coagulation; positive regulation of lipoprotein lipase activity; negative regulation of endothelial cell migration; negative regulation of endothelial cell proliferation; positive regulation of blood coagulation; negative regulation of angiogenesis; triglyceride transport; plasminogen activation; regulation of blood coagulation; negative regulation of myeloid cell apoptotic process; regulation of fibrinolysis; triglyceride metabolic process; negative regulation of smooth muscle cell apoptotic process; platelet degranulation
Sources:Amigo / QuickGO
Orthologs
Databases	NCBI: entry; OMA: entry
Species	Human	Mouse
Entrez	350	11818
Ensembl	ENSG00000091583	ENSMUSG00000000049
UniProt	P02749	Q01339
RefSeq (mRNA)	NM_000042	NM_013475
RefSeq (protein)	NP_000033	NP_038503
Location (UCSC)	Chr 17: 66.21 – 66.26 Mb	Chr 11: 108.23 – 108.31 Mb
PubMed search
- Wikidata
View/Edit Human	View/Edit Mouse

β_{2}-glycoprotein 1, also known as beta-2 glycoprotein 1 and Apolipoprotein H (Apo-H), is a 38 kDa multifunctional plasma protein that in humans is encoded by the APOH gene. One of its functions is to bind cardiolipin. When bound, the structure of cardiolipin and β_{2}-GP1 both undergo large changes in structure. Within the structure of Apo-H is a stretch of positively charged amino acids (protein sequence positions 282-287), Lys-Asn-Lys-Glu-Lys-Lys, which are involved in phospholipid binding (see image on right).

β_{2}-GP1 has a complex involvement in agglutination. It appears to alter adenosine diphosphate (ADP)-mediated agglutination of platelets. Normally, β_{2}-GP1 assumes an anticoagulation activity in serum (by inhibiting coagulation factors); however, changes in blood factors can result in a reversal of that activity.

Although previously referred to as apolipoprotein H, it is not present in appreciable quantities in the lipoprotein fractions, so ApoH is therefore thought to be a misnomer.

== Inhibitory activities ==
β_{2}-GP1 appears to completely inhibit serotonin release by the platelets and prevents subsequent waves of the ADP-induced aggregation. The activity of β_{2}-GP1 appears to involve the binding of negatively charged compounds, occluding the negative charges from binding and activating factor XIIa (Hageman Factor), thus inhibiting agglutination by contact activation of the intrinsic blood coagulation pathway. Additionally, β_{2}-GP1 causes a reduction of the prothrombinase complex binding sites on platelets and additionally reduces the activation caused by collagen when thrombin is present at physiological serum concentrations of β_{2}-GP1, suggesting a regulatory role of β_{2}-GP1 in coagulation.

β_{2}-GP1 also inhibits the generation of factor Xa in the presence of platelets.

In addition, β_{2}-GP1 inhibits the activation of protein C blocking its activity on phosphatidylserine:phosphatidylcholine vesicles however once protein C is activated, Apo-H fails to inhibit activity. Since protein C is involved in factor Va degradation Apo-H indirectly inhibits the degradation of factor Va. This inhibitory activity is diminished by adding phospholipids suggesting the Apo-H inhibition of protein C is phospholipid competitive. This indicates that under certain conditions Apo-H takes on procoagulation properties.

== Pathology ==
Anti-β_{2}-GP1 antibodies are found in both infectious and some systemic autoimmune diseases (eg. systemic lupus erythematosus (SLE)). Positivity for anti-cardiolipin antibodies in diagnostic tests for autoimmune antiphospholipid syndrome requires the presence of β_{2}-GP1in the cardiolipin extract. Anti-β_{2}-GP1 antibodies are strongly associated with thrombotic forms of lupus.

== Sushi 2 protein domain ==
Sushi_2
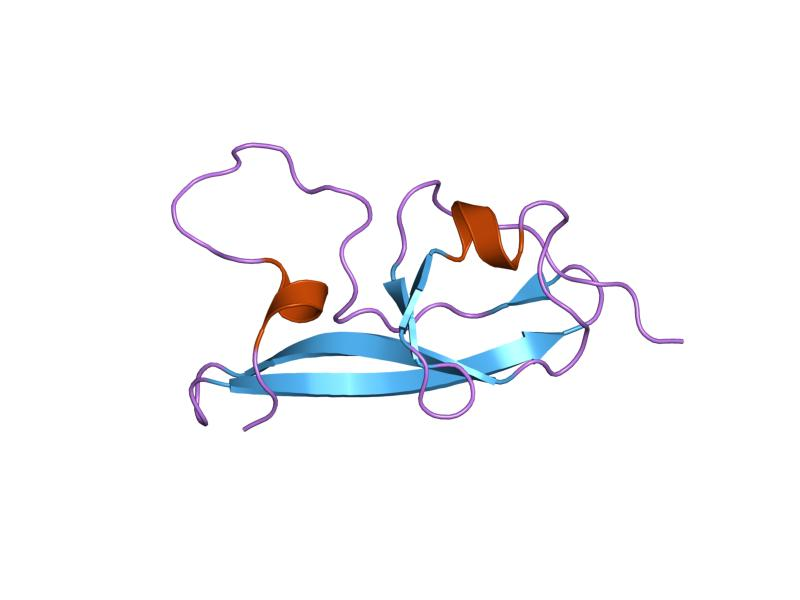
- NMR structure of the fifth domain of human beta-2 glycoprotein 1

Identifiers
- Symbol: Sushi_2
- Pfam: PF09014
- InterPro: IPR015104
Available protein structures:
- PDB: IPR015104 PF09014 (ECOD; PDBsum)
- AlphaFold: IPR015104; PF09014

In molecular biology, the protein domain Sushi 2 is also known as the fifth protein domain of beta-2 glycoprotein 1 (β_{2}-GP1). This protein domain is only found in eukaryotes. The first four domains found in Apolipoprotein H resemble each other, however the fifth one appears to be different.

=== Structure ===
This protein domain is composed of four well-defined anti-parallel beta-strands and two short alpha-helices, as well as a long highly flexible loop. Additionally, the fifth protein domain appears to resemble the other four in Apolipoprotein with the exception of three internal disulfide bonds and an extra C-terminal loop.

=== Function ===
Its exact function remains to be fully elucidated; however it is known to play an important role in the binding of β_{2}-GP1 to negatively charged compounds and subsequent capture for binding of anti-β_{2}-GP1 antibodies. Development of antibodies against β_{2}-GP1 can lead to Antiphospholipid syndrome which often leads to pregnancy complications.
