= Mixing study =

Type of blood plasma screening test

Mixing studies are tests performed on blood plasma of patients or test subjects to distinguish factor deficiencies from factor inhibitors, such as lupus anticoagulant, or specific factor inhibitors, such as antibodies directed against factor VIII. Mixing studies are screening tests widely performed in coagulation laboratories. The basic purpose of these tests is to determine the cause of prolongation of Prothrombin Time (PT), Partial Thromboplastin Time, or sometimes of thrombin time (TT). Mixing studies take advantage of the fact that factor levels that are 50 percent of normal should give a normal Prothrombin time (PT) or Partial thromboplastin time (PTT) result.

== Test method ==
Fresh normal plasma has all the blood coagulation factors with normal levels.

If the problem is a simple factor deficiency, mixing the patient plasma 1:1 with plasma that contains 100% of the normal factor level results in a level ≥50% in the mixture (say the patient has an activity of 0%; the average of 100% + 0% = 50%). The PT or PTT will be normal (the mixing study shows correction). Correction with mixing indicates factor deficiency. Failure to correct with mixing indicates an inhibitor. Performing a thrombin time on the test plasma can provide useful additional information for the interpretation of mixing tests, such as by demonstrating the presence of anticoagulants, hypofibrinogenemia or dysfibrinogenemia.

== Adsorbed Plasma and Aged Plasma ==
Factor deficient plasmas (Adsorbed Plasma and Aged Plasma, etc.) have been used historically in mixing studies. Plasma with known factor deficiencies are commercially available but are very expensive, so they have been prepared in the laboratory and used for mixing tests. Adsorbed plasma or plasma from patients on oral anticoagulants (Warfarin etc.) for a week or more is deficient in Factor II, Factor VII, Factor IX, and Factor X. Plasma from patients on oral anticoagulants (Warfarin etc.) for 48–72 hours is deficient in Factor VII. Aged plasma is deficient in Factor V & Factor VIIIC. Serum is deficient in factors I, V & VIIIC.

=== Correction of prothrombin time ===
Prothrombin time (PT) may be corrected as follows:

Factor Deficiency/Abnormality	Prothrombin Time corrected by mixing with			
Factor Deficiency/Abnormality	Normal Plasma	Adsorbed Plasma	Aged Plasma	Coumarin Plasma
Factor I	Yes	Yes	Yes	Yes
Factor II	Yes	Partial	Yes	Yes
Factor V	Yes	Yes	No	Yes
Factor VII	Yes	No	Yes	No
Factor X	Yes	No	Yes	Yes
Anticoagulants	No	No	No	No

=== Correction of partial thromboplastin time ===
Partial thromboplastin time (PTT) may be corrected as follows:

Factor Deficiency/Abnormality	Partial Thromboplastin Time corrected by mixing with		
Factor Deficiency/Abnormality	Normal Plasma	Adsorbed Plasma	Aged Plasma
Factor VIIIC	Yes	Yes	No
Factor IX	Yes	No	Yes
Factor XI	Yes	Yes	Yes

== Time-dependent inhibitors ==
Some inhibitors are time dependent. In other words, it takes time for the antibody to react with and inactivate the added clotting factor. The clotting test performed immediately after the specimens are mixed may show correction because the antibody has not had time to inactivate its target factor. A test performed after the mixture is incubated for 1 to 2 hours at 37°C will show significant prolongation over the clotting time obtained after immediate mixing. Nonspecific inhibitors like the lupus anticoagulant usually are not time dependent; the immediate mixture will show prolongation. Many specific factor inhibitors are time dependent, and the inhibitor will not be detected unless the test is repeated after incubation (factor VIII inhibitors are notorious for this).

== Abnormal coagulation test results ==
A common problem is an unexplained increase in the PT and/or PTT. If this is observed, the test should be repeated with a fresh sample. Another consideration is heparin. It is possible that the blood sample was mistakenly drawn though a running line. Interference by heparin can be detected by absorbing the heparin with a resin ("Heparsorb") or by using an enzyme to digest the heparin ("Hepzyme"). Also, the patient's history should be checked, especially with regard to anticoagulant use or liver disease. Provided that the abnormal result is reproduced on a fresh specimen and there is no obvious explanation from the history, a mixing study should be performed. If the mixing study shows correction and no prolongation with incubation, factor deficiency should be looked for, starting with VIII and IX. Vitamin K-dependent and nonvitamin K–dependent factors should be considered to rule out vitamin K deficiency, or accidental or surreptitious warfarin ingestion.

== Inhibitor ==
If the mixing study fails to correct, then an inhibitor should be suspected. The most common inhibitor is a nonspecific inhibitor such as a lupus anticoagulant. Perform a test to demonstrate a phospholipid-dependent antibody, such as a platelet neutralization procedure. Spontaneous specific inhibitors against clotting factors occur (i.e. not in hemophiliacs), most often against factor VIII. This can occur in patients with systemic lupus erythematosus, monoclonal gammopathies, other malignancies, during pregnancy and for no apparent reason (idiopathic). These patients can have devastating bleeding. The thing to do is identify the specific factor involved and find out how high the titer is. If the patient has a low titer inhibitor, try to overwhelm it with high doses of the factor. If the patient has a high titer antibody against factor VIII, try porcine factor VIII, activated prothrombin complex concentrate FEIBA (Factor Eight Inhibitor Bypassing Agent), or NovoSeven to stop the bleeding. Prednisone will often lower the titer over time. Intravenous immunoglobulin has been reported to also help but it does not seem to work for hemophiliacs with an inhibitor. Rituximab, cyclophosphamide or other immunosuppressive therapy may be required.

=== Assessing correction of mixing study ===
In order to provide specific cutoffs to distinguish an inhibitor defect from a factor deficiency, the "Rosner index" (index of circulating anticoagulant) and/or the "Chang percentage" (percent correction method) can be used:

$Rosner\;index = \frac{(aPTT\;of\;1:1\;mix) - (aPTT\;of\;normal\;pooled\;plasma)}{aPTT\;of\;nonmixed\;patient\;plasma} x 100$

Results are: ≤10 is classified as correction, ≥15 indicates presence of an inhibitor, and 11-15 is classified as "indeterminate".

$Chang\;percentage = \frac{(aPTT\;of\;nonmixed\;patient\;plasma) - (aPTT\;of\;1:1\;mix)}{(aPTT\;of\;nonmixed\;patient\;plasma) - (aPTT\;of\;normal\;pooled\;plasma)} x 100$

Results are classified as follows: <58% as inhibitor and >70% as correction.

Alternatively, correction into the reference range can be used to define complete correction.

A fourth method is known as Estimated Factor Correction (EFC). This method involves four steps. First, determine the most likely factor suspected to be deficient, based on PT, aPTT, and clinical history. Next, choose the appropriate curve — single factor deficiency, vitamin K-dependent factor deficient, or all factor-deficient. Use this curve to estimate the factor level in the patient sample. Then, predict the factor level and PT or aPTT that will occur after 1:1 mix in case of deficiency. Finally, compare the actual mix results with the predicted results for deficiency.
