= Graham Hughes (rheumatologist) =

British physician, born 1940

Graham Hughes is a rheumatologist. He discovered antiphospholipid syndrome, which was named Hughes syndrome after him, and opened Europe's first lupus clinic. He is editor of the journal Lupus, and has published ten books on lupus and related conditions. Hughes is a fellow of the Royal College of Physicians. He was appointed a Member of the Order of the British Empire for services to Lupus and Hughes syndrome patients in the 2025 birthday honours of Charles III.
