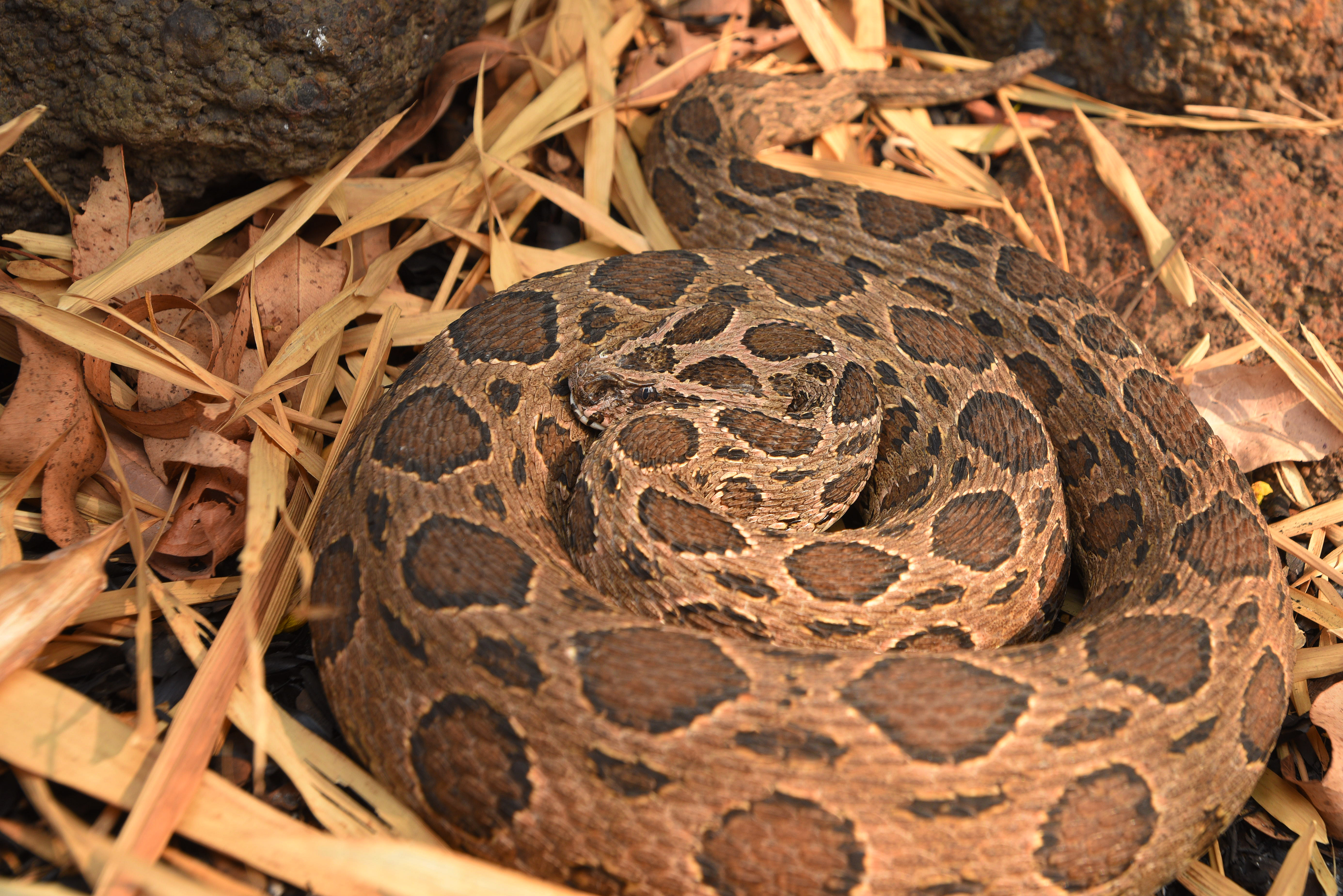
- Specimen from Thailand

Conservation status
- Least Concern (IUCN 3.1)

Scientific classification
- Kingdom: Animalia
- Phylum: Chordata
- Class: Reptilia
- Order: Squamata
- Suborder: Serpentes
- Family: Viperidae
- Genus: Daboia
- Species: D. siamensis

Binomial name
- Daboia siamensis (M.A. Smith, 1917)

Synonyms
- Vipera siamensis M.A. Smith, 1917; Coluber russelli siamensis — Ōshima, 1920; Vipera russelli limitis Mertens, 1927; Vipera russelli formosensis — Maki, 1931; Vipera russelii sublimitis Kopstein, 1936; Vipera russelii formosensis — Klemmer, 1963; Vipera russelii limitis — Klemmer, 1963; Vipera russelii siamensis — Klemmer, 1963; Viper russelli siamensis — Sakuragawa, 1979; Daboia (Daboia) russelli limitis — Obst, 1983; Daboia (Daboia) russelli siamensis — Obst, 1983; Vipera russelli siamensis — Nakada, Nakada, Ito & Inoue, 1984; Vipera russelli burmanus Muang Muang Aye In Gopalakrishnakone & Tan, 1987; Daboia russelli siamensis — Golay et al., 1993

= Daboia siamensis =

Species of snake

Daboia siamensis (Common name: eastern Russell's viper, Siamese Russell's viper, more) is a viper species which is endemic to parts of Southeast Asia, southern China and Taiwan. It was formerly considered to be a subspecies of Daboia russelii (as Daboia russelli siamensis), but was elevated to species status in 2007.

== Description ==
Dorsally, the color pattern is the same as that of D. russelii, except that the color is more grayish or olive, with small spots between the large spot rows. The venter is suffused with gray posteriorly.

== Common names ==
Common names for D. siamensis include eastern Russell's viper and Siamese Russell's viper.

Previously, other common names were used to describe subspecies that are now part of the synonymy of this species: Indonesian Russell's viper for "limitis", and Formosan Russell's viper for "formosensis".

== Geographic range ==
Daboia siamensis is found in Myanmar, Thailand, Cambodia, China(Guangxi Guangdong), parts of India, Taiwan, Nepal and Indonesia (Ende, Bima-Sumbawa, Flores, east Java, Komodo, Lomblen Islands).

Brown (1973) mentions that D. siamensis can also found in Vietnam, Laos and on the Indonesian island of Sumatra. Ditmars (1937) reportedly received a specimen from Sumatra as well. However, its distribution in the Indonesian archipelago is still being elucidated.

== Antivenom ==
As of 2016, antivenoms for Daboia siamensis were produced in India, Myanmar and Thailand.

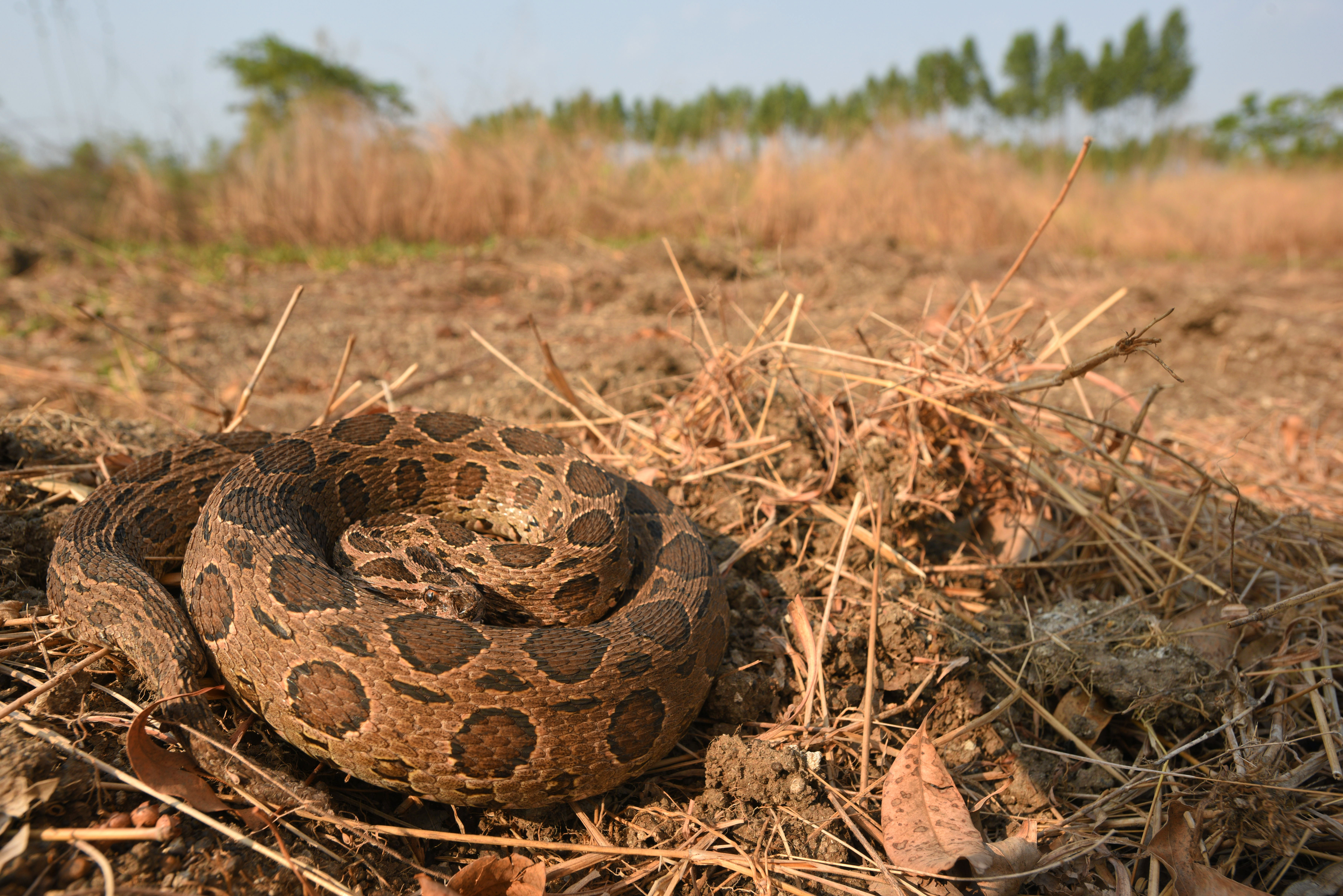
Daboia siamensis in its habitat, in Thailand
