= Partial thromboplastin time =

Test for coagulation of blood

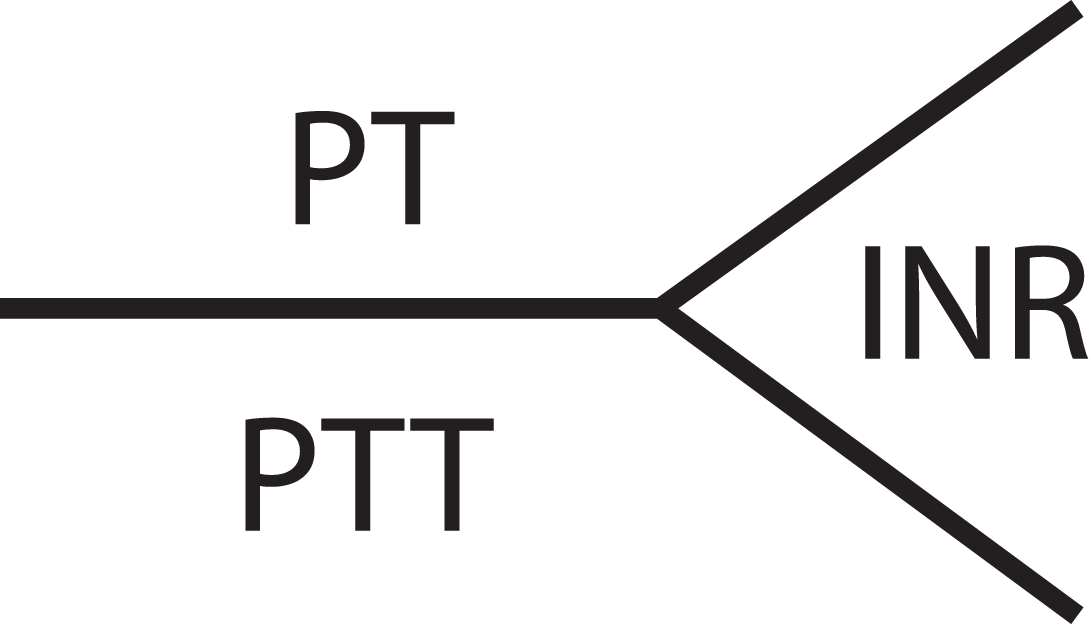
- Common notation (Fishbone Diagram) of coagulation times in medical records
- Other names: Activated partial thromboplastin time; Activated partial prothrombin time; Activated partial thrombin time
- MeSH: D010314

The partial thromboplastin time (PTT), also known as the activated partial thromboplastin time (aPTT or APTT), is a blood test that characterizes coagulation of the blood. A historical name for this measure is the Kaolin-cephalin clotting time (KCCT), reflecting kaolin and cephalin as materials historically used in the test. Apart from detecting abnormalities in blood clotting, partial thromboplastin time is also used to monitor the treatment effect of heparin, a widely prescribed drug that reduces blood's tendency to clot.

The PTT measures the overall speed at which blood clots form by means of two consecutive series of biochemical reactions known as the intrinsic pathway and common pathway of coagulation. The PTT tests the function of all factors except factors VII and XIII. The PTT is often used in conjunction with another measure of how quickly blood clotting takes place called the prothrombin time (PT). The PT measures the speed of clotting by means of the extrinsic pathway and common pathway.

== Methodology ==
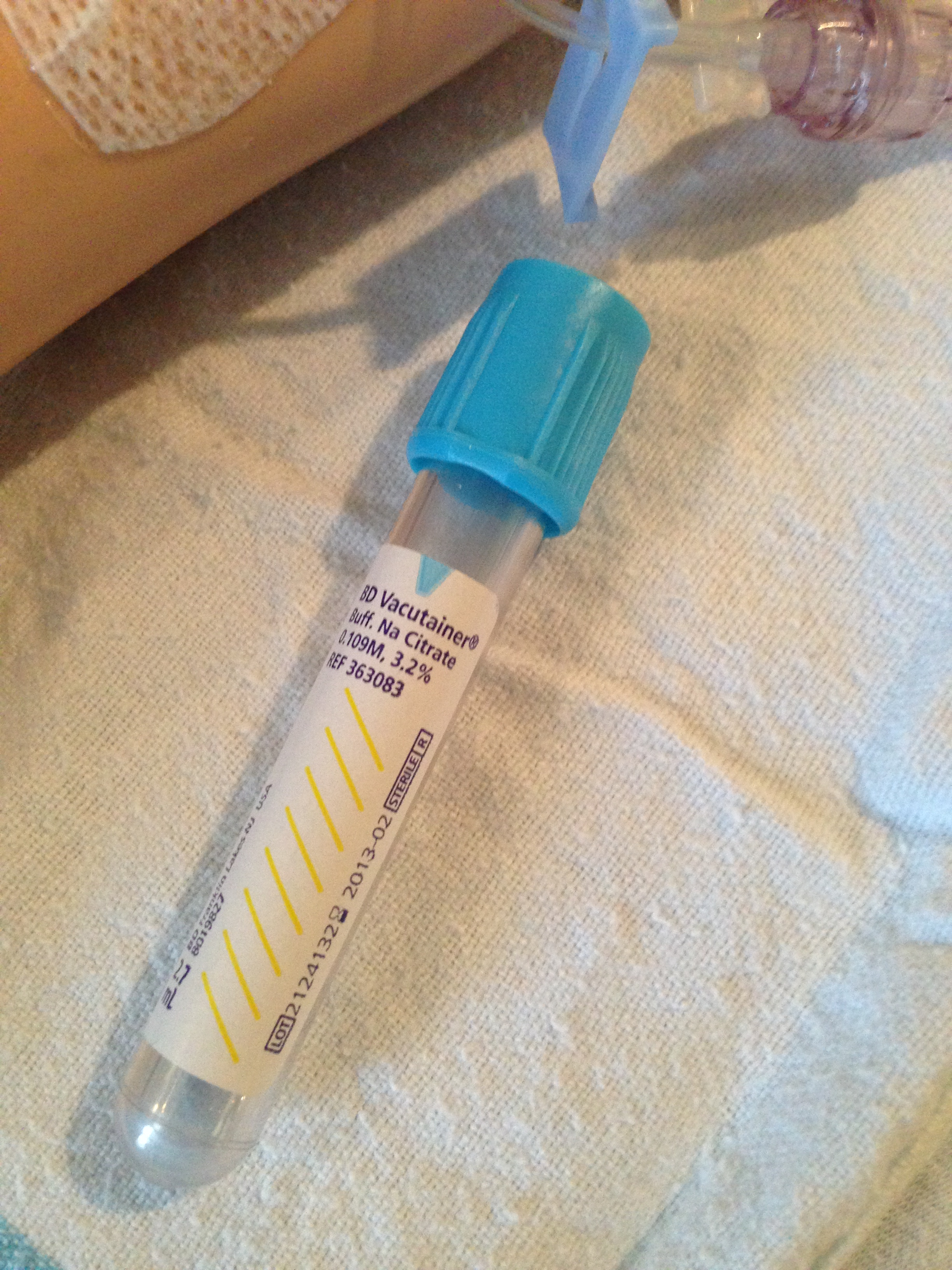
Blue Top Vacutainer tube (sodium citrate vial) used for PT and PTT blood tests

Activated partial thromboplastin time (APTT) is typically analyzed by a medical technologist or laboratory technician, either manually or using an automated instrument at 37°C, which approximates normal human body temperature. Prothrombin time utilizes complete thromboplastin, a combination of tissue factor and phospholipids. In contrast, APTT employs partial thromboplastin, containing only phospholipids and no tissue factor—hence the term "partial thromboplastin time." An activator is used in the APTT test to initiate the intrinsic pathway of blood coagulation. Common activators include kaolin, silica, celite, and ellagic acid.

- Blood is drawn into a test tube containing oxalate or citrate, molecules which act as an anticoagulant by binding the calcium in a sample. The blood is mixed, then centrifuged to separate blood cells from plasma (as partial thromboplastin time is most commonly measured using blood plasma).
- A sample of the plasma is extracted from the test tube and placed into a measuring test tube.
- Next, an excess of calcium (in a phospholipid suspension) is mixed into the plasma sample (to reverse the anticoagulant effect of the citrate enabling the blood to clot again).
- Finally, in order to activate the intrinsic pathway of coagulation, an activator is added, and the time the sample takes to clot is measured optically. Some laboratories use a mechanical measurement, which eliminates interferences from lipemic and icteric samples.

== Interpretation ==
The typical reference range is between 25 seconds and 33 s (depending on laboratory). Longer times of up to 50 s do apply to infants. Shortening of the PTT is considered to have little clinical relevance, but some research indicates that it might increase risk of thromboembolism. Normal PTT requires the presence of the following coagulation factors: I, II, V, VIII, IX, X, XI and XII. Notably, deficiencies in factors VII or XIII will not be detected with the PTT test.

Prolonged aPTT may indicate:

- Use of heparin or warfarin (or contamination of the sample)
- Vitamin K deficiency
- Antiphospholipid antibody (especially lupus anticoagulant, which paradoxically increases propensity to thrombosis)
- Coagulation factor deficiency (e.g., haemophilia, cirrhosis, von Willebrand disease)
- Coagulation factor consumption (e.g., sepsis, disseminated intravascular coagulation)
- Presence of antibodies against coagulation factors (factor inhibitors)
- Von Willebrand disease

To distinguish the above causes, mixing tests are performed, in which the patient's plasma is mixed (initially at a 50:50 dilution) with normal plasma. If the abnormality does not disappear, the sample is said to contain an "inhibitor" (either heparin, antiphospholipid antibodies or coagulation factor specific inhibitors), while if it does disappear a factor deficiency is more likely. Deficiencies of factors VIII, IX, XI and XII and rarely von Willebrand factor (if causing a low factor VIII level) may lead to a prolonged aPTT correcting on mixing studies.

The aPTT is usually normal in pregnancy but tends to slightly decrease in late pregnancy.

== aPTT-based APC resistance test ==
The aPTT-based activated protein C (APC) resistance test is used in the diagnosis of APC resistance (APCR). It involves a modified aPTT test performed in the presence and absence of APC. The ratio of these aPTT values is calculated and is called the APC sensitivity ratio (APCsr) or simply APC ratio (APCr). This ratio is inversely related to the degree of APC resistance. The aPTT-based APC resistance test was developed in 1993.

== History ==
The partial thromboplastin time was first described in 1953 by researchers at the University of North Carolina at Chapel Hill. The initial exogenous phospholipid used in PTT testing was Cephalin.

== See also ==
- Thromboplastin
