= Anti-cardiolipin antibodies =

Type of autoantibody

Schematic representation of antibody

Anti-cardiolipin antibodies (ACA) are antibodies often directed against cardiolipin and found in several diseases, including syphilis, antiphospholipid syndrome, livedoid vasculitis, vertebrobasilar insufficiency, Behçet's syndrome, idiopathic spontaneous abortion, and systemic lupus erythematosus (SLE). They are a form of anti-mitochondrial antibody. In SLE, anti-DNA antibodies and anti-cardiolipin antibodies may be present individually or together; the two types of antibodies act independently. This is in contrast to rheumatoid arthritis with systemic sclerosis (scleroderma) because anti-cardiolipin antibodies are present in both conditions, and therefore may tie the two conditions together.

Anti-cardiolipin antibodies can be classified in two ways:

- As IgM, IgG or IgA
- As β_{2}-glycoprotein dependent or independent
  - In autoimmune disease, ACA are beta-2 glycoprotein dependent
  - In syphilis, ACA are beta-2 glycoprotein independent and can be assayed using the Venereal Disease Research Laboratory test

== Apolipoprotein H involvement ==
β_{2}-glycoprotein I has been identified as apolipoprotein H and is required for the recognition of ACA in autoimmune disease. Only a subset of autoimmune anti-cardiolipin antibodies bind Apo-H, these anti-apolipoprotein antibodies are associated with increased thrombosis.
