= Zahn =

Zahn is a German and Ashkenazi Jewish surname. Notable persons with the surname include:

- Albert Zahn (1864–1953), folk artist from Wisconsin, decorated the Albert Zahn House with carvings.
- Anthony Zahn (born 1974), American cyclist
- Ernst Zahn (1867–1952), Swiss writer
- Friedrich Wilhelm Zahn (1845–1904), German pathologist
- Geoff Zahn (born 1945), American baseball player
- Gordon Zahn (1918–2007), American sociologist and pacifist
- Helmut Zahn (1916–2004), German chemist
- Joachim Zahn (1914–2002), German automotive executive
- Johann Zahn (1641–1707), German canon who wrote on the camera obscura and who invented an early camera
- Johannes Zahn (1817–1895), German musicologist and theologian who developed a taxonomy of Lutheran hymns and melodies
- Karl Hermann Zahn (1865–1940), German botanist
- Margaret A. Zahn, American sociologist and criminologist
- Markus Zahn, (1946-2022) American professor of Electrical engineering
- Otto J. Zahn (1872–1965), American politician
- Paula Zahn (born 1956), American newscaster
- Peter von Zahn, (1913–2001), German author, filmmaker, and journalist
- Robert Zahn (1861–1914), German engineer and industrialist
- Robert Zahn (1870–1945), German classical archaeologist
- Shammai Zahn (1920–2001), British rabbi
- Steve Zahn (born 1967), American actor
- Theodor Zahn (1838–1933), German biblical scholar
- Timothy Zahn (born 1951), American science fiction novelist
- Uwe Zahn (born 1965), German electronic artist
- Wilhelm Zahn (1910–1976) German U-boat commander
- Wilhelm Johann Karl Zahn (1800–1871), German architect, painter and art critic

== See also ==
- Zahn, the former German name of Trzciany, a village in Sępólno County, Kuyavian-Pomeranian Voivodeship, in north-central Poland
- Lines of Zahn, a layered thrombus formed at the site of rapid blood flow
- Zohn, a surname
