= Zahnd =

Zahnd is a surname. Notable people with the surname include:

- Nicole Zahnd (born 1980), Swiss swimmer
- Yves Zahnd (born 1985), Swiss footballer

== See also ==
- Zahn
