= Coronary thrombosis =

Blood clot within the heart's blood vessels

- A medical animation showing the process of a thrombosis blocking the blood vessel
- Specialty: Cardiology
- Complications: Myocardial Infarction

Coronary thrombosis is defined as the formation of a blood clot inside a blood vessel of the heart. This blood clot may then restrict blood flow within the heart, leading to heart tissue damage, or a myocardial infarction, also known as a heart attack.

Coronary thrombosis is most commonly caused as a downstream effect of atherosclerosis, a buildup of cholesterol and fats in the artery walls. The smaller vessel diameter allows less blood to flow and facilitates progression to a myocardial infarction. Leading risk factors for coronary thrombosis are high low-density lipoprotein cholesterol, smoking, sedentary lifestyle, and hypertension.

Symptoms of coronary thrombosis are not always evident at the start. Symptoms include chest pain, shortness of breath, and discomfort in the upper body.

A coronary thrombosis is a medical emergency (life threatening) and requires emergency care at a hospital. Coronary thrombosis often causes heart attack, but is not always the same thing.

== Signs and symptoms ==
A coronary thrombus is asymptomatic until it causes significant obstruction, leading to various forms of angina or eventually a myocardial infarction. Common warning symptoms are crushing chest pain, shortness of breath, and upper body discomfort.

== Pathogenesis ==
Coronary thrombosis and myocardial infarction are sometimes used as synonyms, although this is technically inaccurate as the thrombosis refers to the blocking of blood vessels with a thrombus, while myocardial infarction refers to heart tissue death due to the consequent loss of blood flow to the heart. Due to extensive collateral circulation, a coronary thrombus does not necessarily cause tissue death and may be asymptomatic.

The formation of coronary thrombosis generally follows the same mechanism as other blood clots in the body, the coagulation cascade. Also applicable is the Virchow's triad of blood stasis, endothelial injury, and hypercoagulable state. Atherosclerosis contributes to coronary thrombosis formation by facilitating blood stasis as well as causing local endothelial injury.

Due to the large number of cases of myocardial infarction leading to death and disease in the world, there has been extensive study towards the generation of clots specifically in the coronary arteries. Some areas of focus:

- Coronary thrombosis can be a complication associated with drug-eluting stents. These stents that are placed to open up narrowed arteries are often infused with medicine to prevent repeat stenosis. However, they may actually lead to an increased coronary thrombus formation due to increased tissue factor expression and delayed healing within the vessels. Furthermore, the downstream endothelium has been shown to be impaired, leading to an environment that favors formation of clots. Evidence remains inconclusive about whether these risks outweigh the benefit of a coronary arterial stent.
- Inflammation may play a causal role in coronary artery disease and subsequent myocardial infarction due to coronary thrombosis. Increased levels of inflammation may lead to higher risk of clotting as well as an increased risk of stent/device subsequent thrombosis. There is an ongoing search for inflammatory biomarkers that can help determine at-risk individuals.
- Coronary "microembolization" is being explored as a focal point for coronary thrombus formation and subsequent sudden death due to acute myocardial infarction.
- High mobility group box-1 (HMGB-1) proteins as important mediators in thrombus formation.
- Coronary sinus thrombosis as a severe complication after procedures. The coronary sinus is the venous counterpart to the coronary arteries, where de-oxygenated blood returns from heart tissue. A large thrombus here slows overall blood circulation to heart tissue as well as may mechanically compress a coronary artery.

== Diagnosis ==
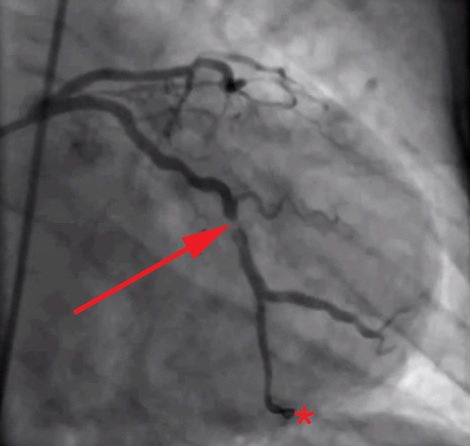
Coronary angiography of a patient with a heart attack.

Clinical signs of myocardial infarction (heart attack) or angina if coronary thrombus is symptomatic:

Imaging modalities used to evaluate the presence of coronary thrombi:

- angioscopy
- endocoronary ultrasound
- coronary angiography
- magnetic resonance imaging (MRI)

Postmortem examiners may look for Lines of Zahn, to determine whether blood clotted in the heart vessels before or after death.

== Management ==
Management of symptomatic coronary thrombosis follows established treatment algorithms for myocardial infarction. Treatment options include:

- emergency coronary artery bypass grafting
- stent implantation
- intracoronary thrombolysis
- anticoagulation with heparin or glycoprotein IIb/IIIa inhibitors
- thrombus aspiration as reperfusion strategy
- platelet P2Y12 receptor inhibitors: a study published in 2001 determined that the addition of clopidogrel showed a positive effect on cardiovascular mortality, non-fatal heart attack, and stroke at the cost of an increased risk of major bleeding.

To address the possibility of identifying and treating asymptomatic coronary artery disease to prevent development of coronary thrombosis, a study published 2018 determined that preemptive treatment with percutaneous coronary intervention did not lead to a difference in death or myocardial infarction over a 15-year period.

There are numerous treatments currently being studied for management and prevention of coronary thrombosis. Statin drugs, in addition to their primary cholesterol-lowering mechanisms of action, have been studied to target a number of pathways that may decrease coronary inflammation and subsequent thrombosis.

Another realm of potential treatments in early stages of adoption is in therapeutic use of contrast ultrasound on thrombus dissolution.

== Terminology ==
Thrombosis is defined as the formation of a thrombus (blood clot) inside a blood vessel, leading to obstruction of blood flow within the circulatory system. Coronary thrombosis refers to the formation and presence of thrombi in the coronary arteries of the heart. The heart does not contain veins, but rather coronary sinuses that serve the purpose of returning de-oxygenated blood from the heart muscle.

A thrombus is a type of embolism, a more general term for any material that partially or fully blocks a blood vessel. An atheroembolism, or cholesterol embolism, is when an atherosclerotic plaque ruptures and becomes an embolism. Atherosclerosis is the progressive thickening of blood vessels and plaque formation that eventually can lead to coronary artery disease.

== See also ==
- Myocardial infarction (heart attack)
