= Thrombus =

Blood clot

- Other names: Blood clot
- Diagram of a thrombus (blood clot) that has blocked a vein valve
- Specialty: Vascular surgery, hematology, interventional radiology
- Symptoms: abrupt change in mental status, chest pain, cramp-like feeling, fatigue, passing out (syncope), and swelling in the arm and/or leg
- Complications: bleeding risks from taking anticoagulants, breathing problems, heart attacks, stroke
- Duration: c. 3–6 months
- Types: Superficial thrombophlebitis and thrombophlebitis migrans
- Causes: injury to the artery, sepsis or viral infection, immobility
- Risk factors: hospitalization, immobility, obesity, pregnancy, physical trauma
- Diagnostic method: magnetic resonance angiography, ultrasound, and venography
- Prevention: smoking cessation, regular exercise, improved blood flow, management of comorbidities
- Treatment: Anticoagulants: edoxaban, tinzaparin, unfractionated heparin
- Medication: apixaban, edoxaban, and rivaroxaban
- Deaths: 100,000–300,000 each year

A thrombus (pl. thrombi) is a solid or semisolid aggregate from constituents of the blood (platelets, fibrin, red blood cells, white blood cells) within the circulatory system during life. A blood clot is the final product of the blood coagulation step in hemostasis in or out of the circulatory system. There are two components to a thrombus: aggregated platelets and red blood cells that form a plug, and a mesh of cross-linked fibrin protein. The substance making up a thrombus is sometimes called cruor. A thrombus is a healthy response to injury intended to stop and prevent further bleeding, but can be harmful in thrombosis, when a clot obstructs blood flow through a healthy blood vessel in the circulatory system.

In the microcirculation consisting of the very small and smallest blood vessels the capillaries, tiny thrombi known as microclots can obstruct the flow of blood in the capillaries. This can cause a number of problems particularly affecting the alveoli in the lungs of the respiratory system resulting from reduced oxygen supply. Microclots have been found to be a characteristic feature in severe cases of COVID-19 and in long COVID.

Mural thrombi are thrombi that adhere to the wall of a large blood vessel or heart chamber. They are most commonly found in the aorta, the largest artery in the body, more often in the descending aorta, and less often in the aortic arch or abdominal aorta. They can restrict blood flow but usually do not block it entirely. They appear grey-red along with alternating light and dark lines (known as lines of Zahn) which represent bands of white blood cells and red blood cells (darker) entrapped in layers of fibrin.

== Classification ==
Thrombi are classified into two major groups depending on their location and the relative amount of platelets and red blood cells. The two major groups are:

1. Arterial or white thrombi (characterized by predominance of platelets)
2. Venous or red thrombi (characterized by predominance of red blood cells).

=== Microclots ===
In the microcirculation consisting of the very small and smallest blood vessels, the capillaries, tiny thrombi (microthrombi) known as microclots can obstruct the flow of blood in the capillaries. Microclots are small clumps of blood that form within the circulation, possibly as a result of a larger thrombus breaking down into smaller pieces or more likely by accretion. They can be a cause for concern as they can lead to blockages in small vessels and restrict blood flow, leading to tissue damage and potentially causing ischemic events. This can in turn lead to a form of chronic ischaemia-reperfusion injury and to the generation of autoantibodies. Because of their amyloid nature they are somewhat resistant to thrombolytic agents, which, along with the presence of certain other proteins, explains their persistence. Evidence based on the proteomes of such microclots implies that the macroclots formed in other diseases should also be amyloid in character; this has been shown for ischaemic stroke.

Microclots can cause a number of problems particularly affecting the alveoli in the lungs of the respiratory system, resulting from reduced oxygen supply. Microclots have been found to be a characteristic feature in severe cases of COVID-19, and in long COVID. Fibrinaloid microclots can be induced directly via the addition of SARS-CoV-2 spike protein to 'healthy' plasma, and the fact that the amyloidogenic potential of the spike variant is related to its virulence provides a strong indication that the microclots are on the aetiological pathway of long COVID.

The fibrinaloid microclots also provide a ready explanation for other phenomena such as Postural Orthostatic Tachycardia Syndrome (POTS), atrial fibrillation, and fibromyalgia.

Fibrinaloid microclots are easily measured using techniques such as fluorescence microscopy and flow cytometry ('flow clotometry').

=== Mural thrombi ===
Mural thrombi form and adhere on the inner wall of a large blood vessel or heart chamber, often as a result of blood stasis. They are most commonly found in the aorta, the largest artery in the body, more often in the descending aorta, and less often in the aortic arch or abdominal aorta. They can restrict blood flow but usually do not block it entirely, either because they do not block the lumen or because they are porous. Mural thrombi are usually found in vessels already damaged by atherosclerosis.

A mural thrombus can affect any heart chamber. When found in the left ventricle it is often a result of a heart attack complication. The thrombus in this case can separate from the chamber, be carried through arteries and block a blood vessel. They appear grey-red with alternating light and dark lines (known as lines of Zahn) which represent bands of white blood cells and red blood cells (darker) entrapped in layers of fibrin.

== Cause ==
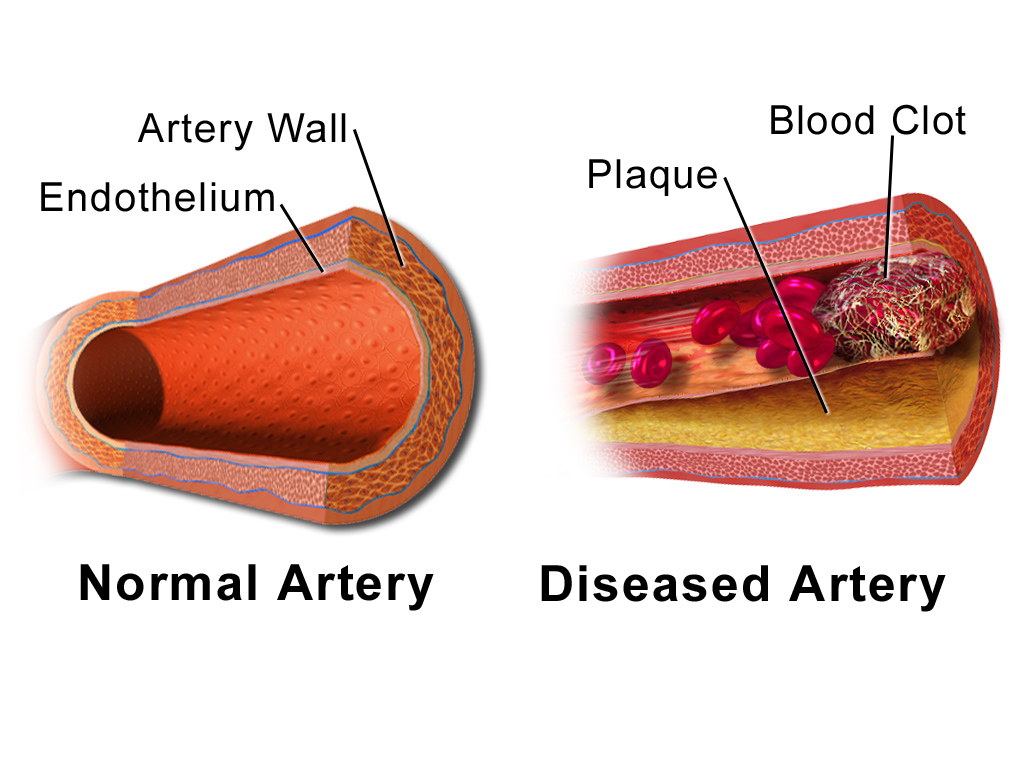
Illustration comparing normal artery with diseased artery with a blood clot.

It was suggested over 150 years ago that thrombus formation is a result of abnormalities in blood flow, vessel wall, and blood components. This concept is now known as Virchow's triad. The three factors have been further refined to include circulatory stasis, vascular wall injury, and hypercoagulable state, all of which contribute to increased risk for venous thromboembolism and other cardiovascular diseases.

Virchow's triad describes the pathogenesis of thrombus formation:

1. Endothelial injury: Injury to the endothelium (interior surface of blood vessel), causing platelet activation and aggregation;
  - Common causes include: trauma, smoking, hypertension, atheroma.
2. Hemodynamic changes (stasis, turbulence): Blood stasis promotes greater contact between platelets/coagulative factors with vascular endothelium. If rapid blood circulation (e.g., because of tachycardia) occurs within vessels that have endothelial injuries, that creates disordered flow (turbulence) that can lead to the formation of thrombosis;
  - Common causes of stasis include anything that leads to prolonged immobility and reduced blood flow such as: trauma/broken bones and extended air travel.
3. Hypercoagulability (also called thrombophilia; any disorder of the blood that predisposes to thrombosis);
  - Common causes include: cancer (leukaemia), factor V mutation (Leiden) – prevents Factor V inactivation leading to increased coagulability.

Disseminated intravascular coagulation (DIC) involves widespread microthrombi formation throughout the majority of the blood vessels. This is due to excessive consumption of coagulation factors and subsequent activation of fibrinolysis using all of the body's available platelets and clotting factors. The result is hemorrhaging and ischemic necrosis of tissue/organs. Causes are septicaemia, acute leukaemia, shock, snake bites, fat emboli from broken bones, or other severe traumas. DIC may also be seen in pregnant females. Treatment involves the use of fresh frozen plasma to restore the level of clotting factors in the blood, as well as platelets and heparin to prevent further thrombi formation.. Both Disseminated intravascular coagulation and sepsis are closely correlated with the presence of fibrinaloid microclots in the circulation.

== Pathophysiology ==
Animation of the formation of an occlusive thrombus in a vein. A few platelets attach themselves to the valve lips, constricting the opening and causing more platelets and red blood cells to aggregate and coagulate. Coagulation of unmoving blood on both sides of the blockage may propagate a clot in both directions.

A thrombus occurs when the hemostatic process, which normally occurs in response to injury, becomes activated in an uninjured or slightly injured vessel. A thrombus in a large blood vessel will decrease blood flow through that vessel (termed a mural thrombus). In a small blood vessel, blood flow may be completely cut off (termed an occlusive thrombus), resulting in death of tissue supplied by that vessel. If a thrombus dislodges and becomes free-floating, it is considered an embolus. If an embolus becomes trapped within a blood vessel, it blocks blood flow and is termed as an embolism. Embolisms, depending on their specific location, can cause more significant effects like strokes, heart attacks, or even death.

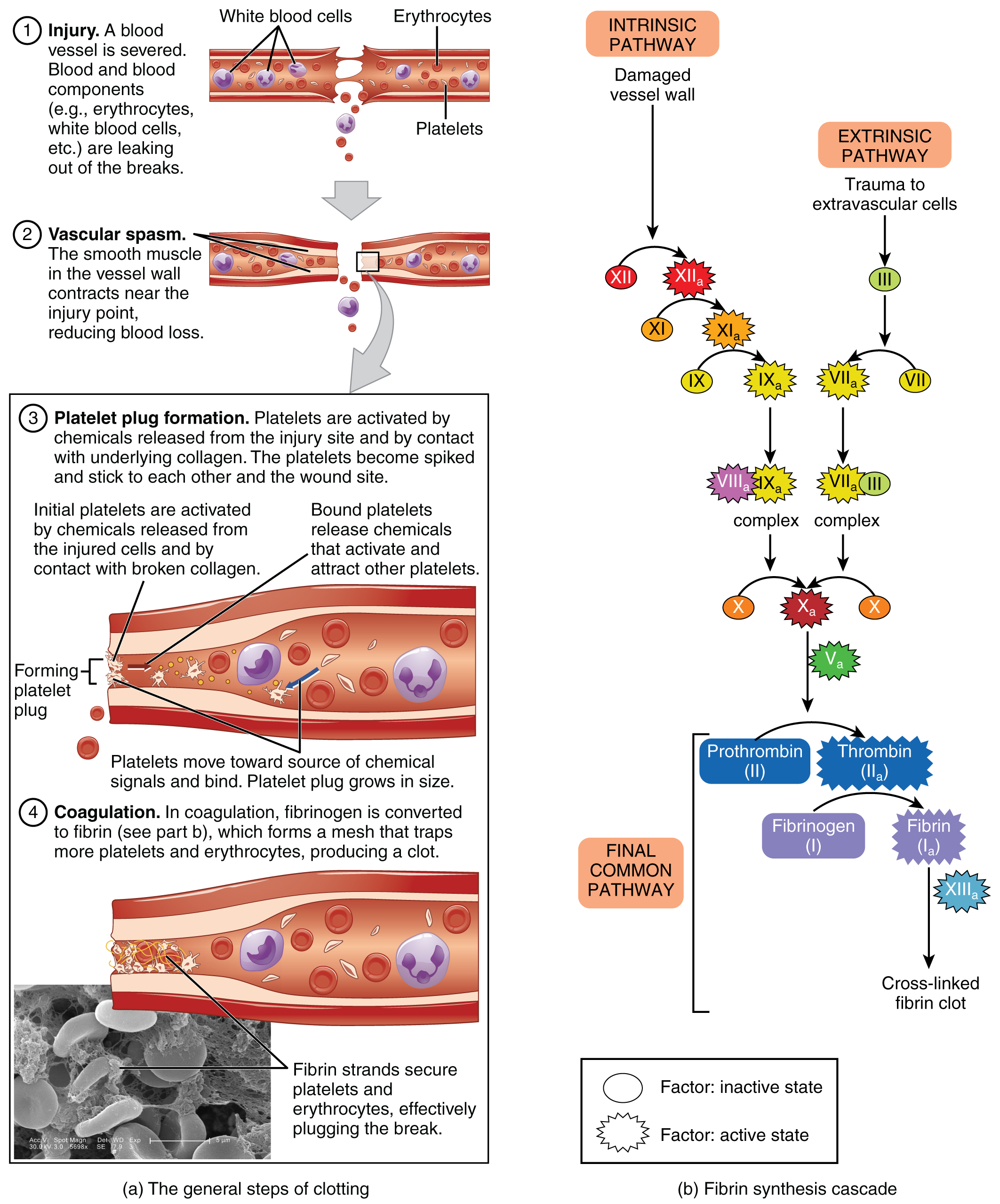
Mechanism of blood clotting

Some of the conditions which increase the risk of blood clots developing include atrial fibrillation (a form of cardiac arrhythmia), heart valve replacement, a recent heart attack (also known as a myocardial infarction), extended periods of inactivity (see deep venous thrombosis), and genetic or disease-related deficiencies in the blood's clotting abilities.

=== Formation ===
Platelet activation occurs through injuries that damage the endothelium of the blood vessels, exposing the enzyme called factor VII, a protein normally circulating within the vessels, to the tissue factor, which is a protein encoded by the F3 gene. The platelet activation can potentially cause a cascade, eventually leading to the formation of the thrombus. This process is regulated through thromboregulation.

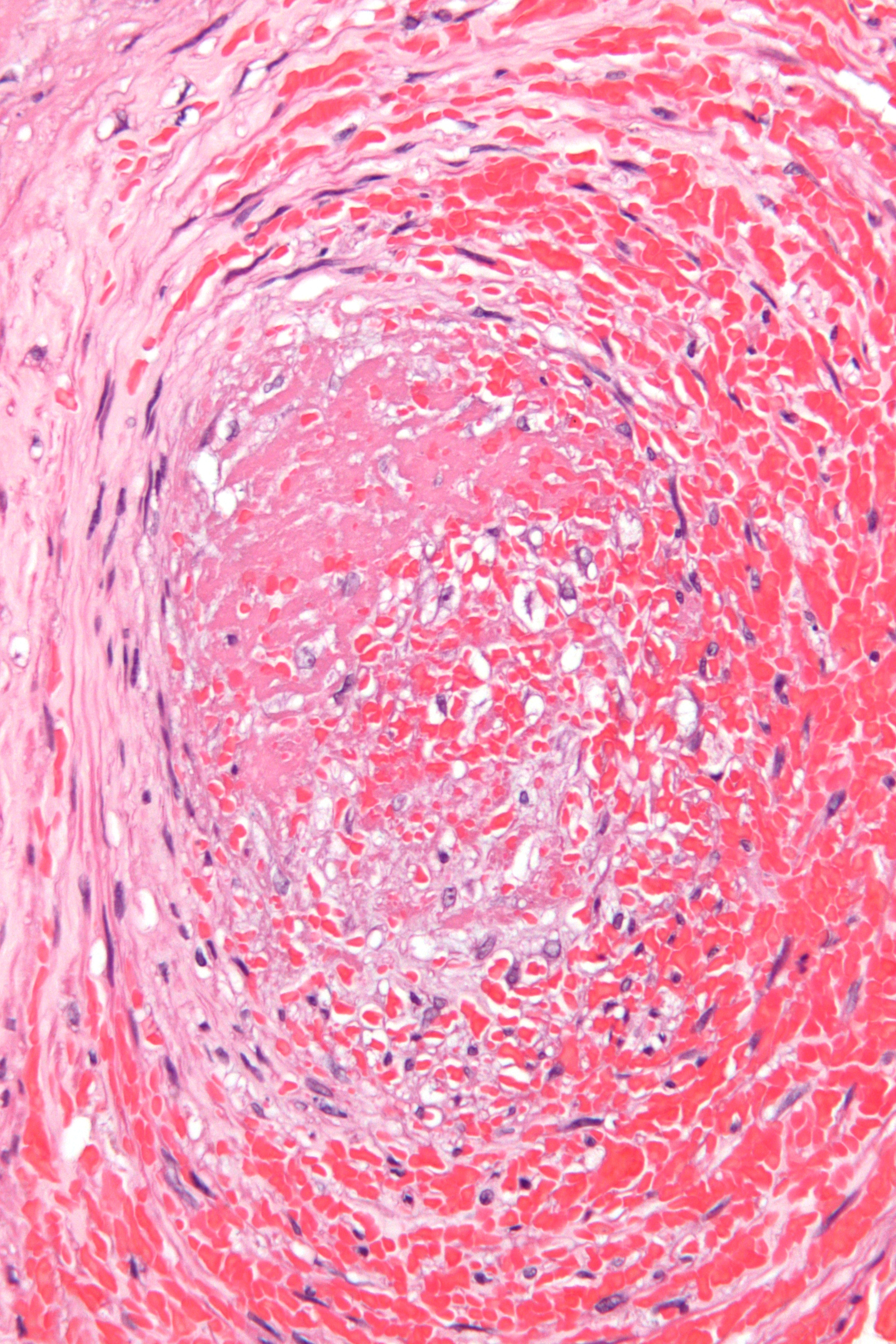
Micrograph showing a thrombus (center of image) within a blood vessel of the placenta. H&E stain.

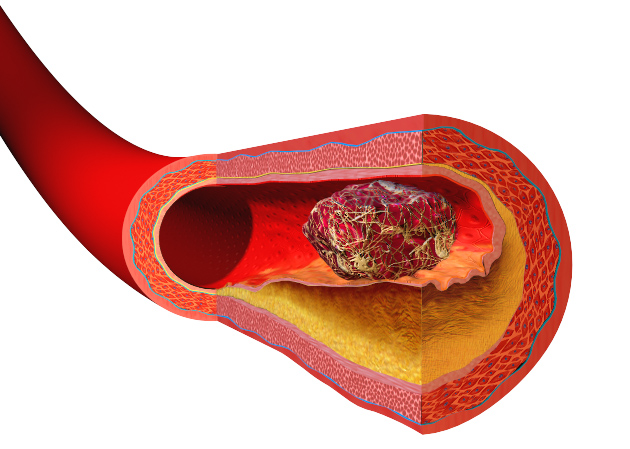
Illustration depicting thrombus formation over arterial plaque.

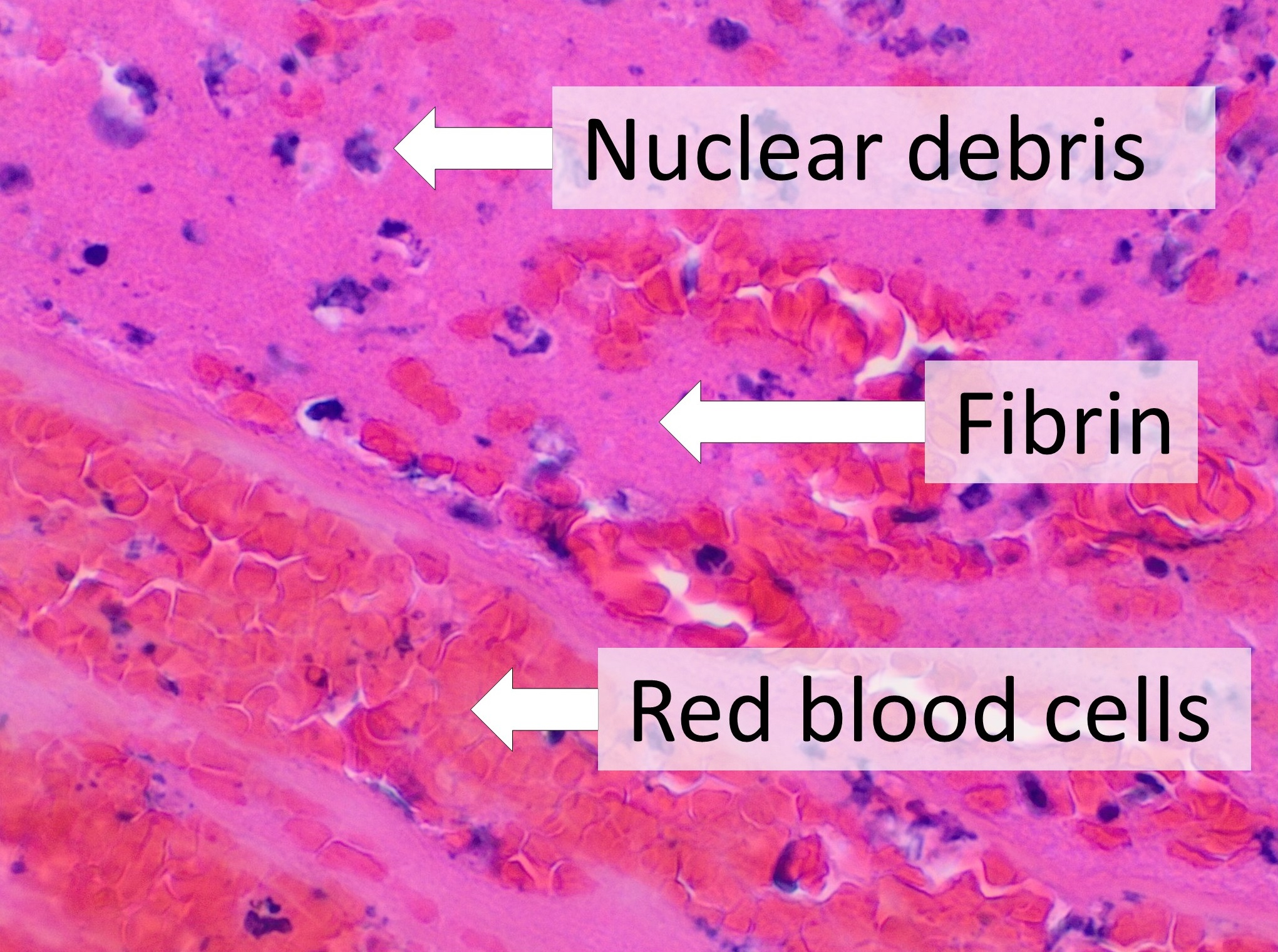
Composition of a fresh thrombus at microscopy, showing nuclear debris in a background of fibrin and red blood cells.

== Prevention ==
Anticoagulants are drugs used to prevent the formation of blood clots, reducing the risk of stroke, heart attack and pulmonary embolism. Heparin and warfarin are used to inhibit the formation and growth of existing thrombi, with the former used for acute anticoagulation while the latter is used for long-term anticoagulation. The mechanism of action of heparin and warfarin are different as they work on different pathways of the coagulation cascade.

Heparin works by binding to and activating the enzyme inhibitor antithrombin III, an enzyme that acts by inactivating thrombin and factor Xa. In contrast, warfarin works by inhibiting vitamin K epoxide reductase, an enzyme needed to synthesize vitamin K dependent clotting factors II, VII, IX, and X. Bleeding time with heparin and warfarin therapy can be measured with the partial thromboplastin time (PTT) and prothrombin time (PT), respectively.

== Treatment ==
Once clots have formed, other drugs can be used to promote thrombolysis or clot breakdown. Streptokinase, an enzyme produced by streptococcal bacteria, is one of the oldest thrombolytic drugs. This drug can be administered intravenously to dissolve blood clots in coronary vessels. However, streptokinase causes systemic fibrinolytic state and can lead to bleeding problems. Tissue plasminogen activator (tPA) is a different enzyme that promotes the degradation of fibrin in clots but not free fibrinogen. This drug is made by transgenic bacteria and converts plasminogen into the clot-dissolving enzyme, plasmin. Recent research indicates that tPA could have toxic effects in the central nervous system. In cases of severe stroke, tPA can cross the blood–brain barrier and enter interstitial fluid, where it then increases excitotoxicity, potentially affecting permeability of the blood–brain barrier, and causing cerebral hemorrhage.

There are also some anticoagulants that come from animals that work by dissolving fibrin. For example, Haementeria ghilianii, an Amazon leech, produces an enzyme called hementin from its salivary glands.

== Prognosis ==
Thrombus formation can have one of four outcomes: propagation, embolization, dissolution, and organization and recanalization.

1. Propagation of a thrombus occurs towards the direction of the heart and involves the accumulation of additional platelets and fibrin. This means that it is anterograde in veins or retrograde in arteries.
2. Embolization occurs when the thrombus breaks free from the vascular wall and becomes mobile, thereby traveling to other sites in the vasculature. A venous embolus (mostly from deep vein thrombosis in the lower limbs) will travel through the systemic circulation, reach the right side of the heart, and travel through the pulmonary artery, resulting in a pulmonary embolism. Arterial thrombosis resulting from hypertension or atherosclerosis can become mobile and the resulting emboli can occlude any artery or arteriole downstream of the thrombus formation. This means that cerebral stroke, myocardial infarction, or any other organ can be affected.
3. Dissolution occurs when the fibrinolytic mechanisms break up the thrombus and blood flow is restored to the vessel. This may be aided by fibrinolytic drugs such as Tissue Plasminogen Activator (tPA) in instances of coronary artery occlusion. The best response to fibrinolytic drugs is within a couple of hours, before the fibrin meshwork of the thrombus has been fully developed.
4. Organization and recanalization involves the ingrowth of smooth muscle cells, fibroblasts and endothelium into the fibrin-rich thrombus. If recanalization proceeds it provides capillary-sized channels through the thrombus for continuity of blood flow through the entire thrombus but may not restore sufficient blood flow for the metabolic needs of the downstream tissue.

== See also ==
- Thrombogenicity (the tendency to clot)
- National Blood Clot Alliance
- Hemorrhoid
