= Zhan =

Zhan may refer to:

== Places ==
- Zhan, Kurdistan, an Iranian village in Kurdistan Province
- Zhan Rural District in Lorestan Province, Iran
  - Zhan, Lorestan, a village in Zhan Rural District

== Names ==
- Zhan (surname), several Chinese-language surnames

== Given name ==
- Zhuge Zhan (227–263), Chinese politician
- Zhang Zhan (born 1983), Chinese lawyer and citizen journalist
- Gao Zhan (21st century), Chinese smuggler
- Zhan Videnov (born 1959), Prime Minister of Bulgaria
- Zhan Bush (born 1993), Russian/Israeli figure skater

== See also ==
- Zahn
