= Developmental Haemostasis =

The haemostatic (blood clotting) system involves the interaction of proteins in the blood, the blood vessel wall and the flow of blood to control bleeding and blood clotting. Developmental Haemostasis is a term that represents the maturation of the haemostatic system from birth to adulthood. There are differences in the concentration, structure and activity of many proteins involved in blood clotting. These changes play an important role in physiological development and are important in providing appropriate diagnosis and treatment of bleeding and clotting disorders (e.g. thrombosis). The age-specific differences in the blood clotting system may contribute to the fact that children are less prone to developing thrombosis compared to adults.

== Differences in structure of haemostatic proteins ==
Studies have shown that there are structural differences in some of the major blood clotting proteins in newborns and children when compared to adults. These structural differences can lead to differences in the activity of haemostatic proteins within the blood clotting system, as well as other physiological systems (e.g. immune system).

Some examples of age-specific differences in the structure of blood clotting proteins are:

- Fibrinogen The fetal form of fibrinogen has increased sialic acid and phosphorus content compared to the adult form, affecting assembly of fibrin from fibrinogen to form blood clots. This means that blood clotting takes longer in newborns. Structural differences in fibrinogen extend into childhood, where fibrinogen from children has a higher molecular weight compared to adults.
- Protein C is active in anticoagulation (anti-clotting) and breaking down blood clots. A newborn form of protein C has been detected and has a higher proportion of single chain molecules than the adult two-chain molecule.
- Antithrombin is an anticoagulant protein and is important in preventing blood clotting. In animal studies, Antithrombin in newborns has a decreased sialic acid content compared to adults. There are also differences in the way Antithrombin interacts with Heparin, an important anti-blood clotting drug. There is more Antithrombin bound to Heparin in blood from newborns compared to blood from adults, suggesting different structural forms of the protein. The size of the Antithrombin molecules in neonates and children is larger than in adults.

== Differences in concentration and function of haemostatic proteins ==
- Antithrombin: the levels of antithrombin increase with age. Antithrombin levels in newborns are less than 50% of the levels in adults. By six months of age Antithrombin levels increase to adult levels. Antinthrombin is present in various isoforms. There is an increase in the concentration of a specific isoform of Antithrombin, Latent Antithrombin with age. This form of Antithrombin is known to be associated with thrombosis and hence decreased levels in children may help protect them from spontaneous thrombosis. There is also an increased activity of another form of Antithrombin, Beta Antithrombin in newborns compared to older children and adults.
- alpha-2-Macroglobulin (A2M): is also a major inhibitor of thrombin. It is present in 2-3 fold higher concentration during childhood, approaching adult levels in late teenage years. It has been shown that a higher proportion of thrombin is inhibited by A2M in children than adults. This suggests that in children, A2M plays a more important role in thrombin inhibition compared to antithrombin.
- Platelets: are blood cells that once activated, aggregate and form clots. There are age-related differences in platelet number and their activity. They form aggregates with white blood cells and in adults the platelets that are bound to white blood cells are usually activated. In children, these white blood cell-platelet aggregates are increased in children compared to adult levels, however this takes place without a corresponding increase in platelet activation. Increased white blood cell-platelet aggregates in adults can indicate atherosclerosis, but this is not the case in children.

== Implications ==
Reference ranges demonstrate the normal test values for a healthy population. Diseases and disorders are diagnosed when a test value is outside the reference range. Many laboratories compare paediatric results to adult reference ranges or to published paediatric reference ranges that may not be specific for the test used. This can lead to misdiagnosis or over-diagnosis of blood clotting disorders as many proteins exist at levels during stages of infancy that would be associated with disease in adults. This can lead to unnecessary stress for families and can have significant medical implications for the child (e.g. further testing). The differences in the haemostatic proteins can lead to different interactions with anticoagulant drugs that are used to prevent and treat thrombosis in children. More studies are required to determine the optimal treatment strategies and doses of anticoagulants in children.

The role of developmental haemostasis in normal physiology is still not fully understood. It has been observed that the newborn haemostatic system is protective and contributes to a decreased risk of bleeding or thrombosis compared to adults. The differences may also be due to the role haemostatic proteins play within other physiological systems.
