= Thromboregulation =

Thromboregulation is the series of mechanisms in how a primary clot is regulated. These mechanisms include, competitive inhibition or negative feedback. It includes primary hemostasis, which is the process of how blood platelets adhere to the endothelium of an injured blood vessel. Platelet aggregation is fundamental to repair vascular damage and the initiation of the blood thrombus formation. The elimination of clots is also part of thromboregulation. Failure in platelet clot regulation may cause hemorrhage or thrombosis. Substances called thromboregulators control every part of these events.

== Primary hemostasis inducers ==
One primary function of thromboregulation is the control of primary hemostasis, which is the platelet aggregation process. Some thromboregulators enhance platelet aggregation and some others inhibit the process. Platelet aggregation plays a critical role in the genesis of a resulting thrombus. Adhesion should remain local, but platelet aggregation must grow exponentially to form a platelet thrombus and prevent blood loss. Platelet aggregation factors are the regulators that enhance the adhesion and stimulate the platelets to secrete its granules. It has been shown that collagen, exposed after the injury to the endothelial cover of the vessel, plays as an agonist in platelet adhesion and its activation. The binding of platelets to the sub-endothelial collagen stimulates the secretion of ADP, TXA2, and serotonin present in the platelet granules.

ADP-dependent aggregation is mediated by two receptors: the purinergic P2Y1, coupled to Gαq, mediates the shape in the structure of platelets and triggers the aggregation process. Thromboxane A2 (TX2) has a positive feedback in platelet activation. It is produced by the oxygenation of arachidonic acid by two enzymes: cycloxygenase and thromboxane A2 synthase. TX2 effects are mediated by G protein-coupled receptors, subtypes TPα and TPβ. Both receptors mediate phospholipase C stimulation causing an increase of intracellular levels of inositol 1,4,5-triphosphate and diacylglycerol. Inositol 1,4,5-triphosphate causes an increase in Ca concentration and the release of diacylglycerol activates PKC. TPα stimulates cAMP levels whereas TPβ inhibits the level of intracellular cAMP. Serotonin, 5-HT, is an amine synthesized in the gut and it is released into the bloodstream after the activation of presynaptic neurons or enterochromaffin cells stimulation. Later, it is sequestered by the platelets using antidepressant-sensitive 5-HT transporters (SERTs) and into platelet's granules by the vesicular monoamine transporter (VMAT). After the secretion, 5-HT increases the effects of prothrombotic agents by its binding with 5-HT2 receptors

== Primary hemostasis inhibitors ==
Thromboregulation is also in charge of regulating the process of clot elimination, called primary hemostasis inhibition. These inhibitors are substances that prevent the clot formation by preventing platelet adhesion. Platelet inhibition is important to prevent thrombotic episodes or the formation of blood clot and consequently preventing heart attacks and strokes. Some primary hemostasis inhibitors are cAMP, prostacyclin, PGE1, and kistrin. cAMP, cyclic adenosine monophosphate, phosphorylate messengers via protein kinase A (PKA). These signaling elements include thromboxane A2, receptor type α, phospholipase Cβ3, and IP3 receptors. Signalization in platelets is very sensitive in cAMP levels. Nitric oxide (NO) stimulates cGMP production and therefore the activation cGMP-dependent protein kinase (G kinase). This kinase inhibits Gαq-phospholipase C-inositol 1,4,5-triphosphate signaling and the mobilization of calcium inside the cell for thromboxane A2. PGI2, prostacyclin, binds to IP receptors that catalyze cAMP formation. This process is mediated via GTP-binding protein Gs and adenylyl cyclase. PGE1 binds to IP receptors. IP receptors bind with ionophores that induce ADP and serotonin secretion. PGE1 inhibits the secretion of factors that stimulate platelet aggregation by competitive inhibition. Kistrin is a protein inhibitor of platelet aggregation. It belongs to the homologous family of glycoprotein IIb-IIa antagonists. Kistrin has an adhesion site that binds to GP IIb-IIIa.
