= National Blood Clot Alliance =

American nonprofit medical organization

The National Blood Clot Alliance or NBCA for short, formerly known as the National Alliance for Thrombosis and Thrombophilia (NATT), is a United States nationwide 501(c)(3) nonprofit organization of patients and medical professionals committed to raising awareness about thrombosis and thrombophilia and is dedicated to preventing and treating health problems caused by blood clots and blood clotting disorders.

== Organization ==
NBCA is headquartered in Philadelphia. NBCA's mission is advancing the prevention, early diagnosis and successful treatment of life-threatening blood clots such as deep vein thrombosis and pulmonary embolism.

NBCA works on behalf of people who may be susceptible to blood clots, including, but not limited to, people with clotting disorders, atrial fibrillation, cancer, traumatic injury, and risks related to surgery, lengthy immobility, child birth and birth control.

NBCA accomplishes its mission through programs that build public awareness, educate patients and healthcare professionals, and promote supportive public and private sector policy. prevent, diagnose and treat thrombosis and thrombophilia through research, education, support and advocacy. The current president is Leslie Lake.

== Activities ==
In a 2007 press release, NBCA announced the award of two grants totaling $1.3 million from the US Centers for Disease Control and Prevention to “launch a national wake-up call to promote public and healthcare professional awareness of this serious medical condition that each year kills nearly 300,000 Americans.”

In July 2014, NBCA launched its "Stop the Clot" website with resources for health professionals, patients and family members including healthcare provider listings, patient stories, a knowledge base of articles and reference materials on blood clots and blood clotting disorders. NBCA also sponsors educational seminars and publishes materials to raise awareness of blood clotting issues.
