= Hemostasis =

Process of preventing and stopping bleeding

In biology, hemostasis or haemostasis is a process to prevent and stop bleeding, meaning to keep blood within a damaged blood vessel (the opposite of hemostasis is hemorrhage). It is the first stage of wound healing. Hemostasis involves three major steps:

- vasoconstriction
- temporary blockage of a hole in a damaged blood vessel by a platelet plug
- blood coagulation (formation of fibrin clots)

Coagulation, the changing of blood from a liquid to a gel which forms the fibrin clots, is essential to hemostasis. Intact blood vessels moderate blood's tendency to form clots. The endothelial cells of intact vessels prevent blood clotting with a heparin-like molecule and thrombomodulin, and prevent platelet aggregation with nitric oxide and prostacyclin. When endothelium of a blood vessel is damaged, the endothelial cells stop secretion of coagulation and aggregation inhibitors and instead secrete von Willebrand factor, which initiates the maintenance of hemostasis after injury. These processes seal the injury or hole until tissues are healed.

== Etymology and pronunciation ==
The word hemostasis (/ˌhiːmoʊˈsteɪsɪs/, sometimes /ˌhiːˈmɒstəsɪs/) uses the combining forms hemo- and -stasis, Neo-Latin from Ancient Greek αἱμο- haimo- (similar to αἷμα haîma), meaning "blood", and στάσις stásis, meaning "stasis", yielding "motionlessness or stopping of blood".

== Steps of mechanism ==
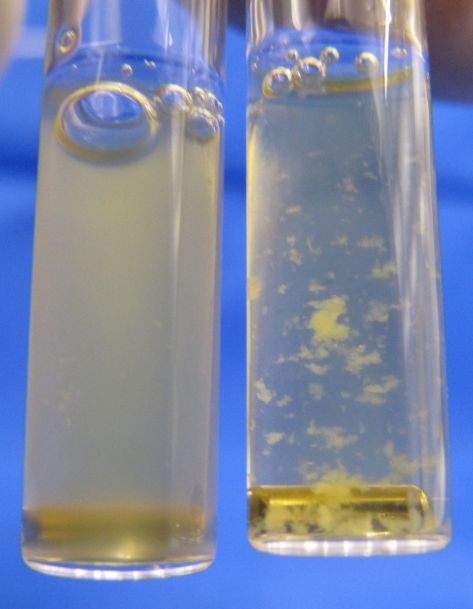
Aggregation of thrombocytes (platelets). Platelet-rich human blood plasma (left vial) is a turbid liquid. Upon addition of ADP, platelets are activated and start to aggregate, forming white flakes (right vial).

Hemostasis occurs when blood is present outside of the body or blood vessels. It is the innate response for the body to stop bleeding and loss of blood. During hemostasis three steps occur in a rapid sequence. Vascular spasm is the first response as the blood vessels constrict to allow less blood to be lost. In the second step, platelet plug formation, platelets stick together to form a temporary seal to cover the break in the vessel wall. The third and last step is called coagulation or blood clotting. Coagulation reinforces the platelet plug with fibrin threads that act as a "molecular glue". Platelets are a large factor in the hemostatic process. They allow for the creation of the "platelet plug" that forms almost directly after a blood vessel has been ruptured. Within seconds of a blood vessel's epithelial wall being disrupted, platelets begin to adhere to the sub-endothelium surface. It takes approximately sixty seconds until the first fibrin strands begin to intersperse among the wound. After several minutes the platelet plug is completely formed by fibrin. Hemostasis is maintained in the body via three mechanisms:

1. Vascular spasm: Vasoconstriction is produced by vascular smooth muscle cells, and is the blood vessel's first response to injury. The smooth muscle cells are controlled by vascular endothelium, which releases intravascular signals to control the contracting properties. When a blood vessel is damaged, there is an immediate reflex, initiated by local sympathetic pain receptors, which helps promote vasoconstriction. The damaged vessels will constrict (vasoconstrict) which reduces the amount of blood flow through the area and limits the amount of blood loss. Collagen is exposed at the site of injury, the collagen promotes platelets to adhere to the injury site. Platelets release cytoplasmic granules which contain serotonin, ADP and thromboxane A2, all of which increase the effect of vasoconstriction. The spasm response becomes more effective as the amount of damage is increased. Vascular spasm is much more effective in smaller blood vessels.
2. Platelet plug formation: Bone-marrow cells can be mobilized into the circulation during which myeloid-and megakaryocyte-biased progenitors and mature megakaryocytes may enter the bloodstream. Platelets derived from these megakaryocytes contribute broadly to hemostasis, thrombosis, inflammation, and vascular biology through platelet generation. Platelets adhere to damaged endothelium to form a platelet plug (primary hemostasis) and then degranulate. This process is regulated through thromboregulation. Plug formation is activated by a glycoprotein called von Willebrand factor (vWF), which is found in plasma. Platelets play one of major roles in the hemostatic process. When platelets come across the injured endothelium cells, they change shape, release granules and ultimately become ‘sticky’. Platelets express certain receptors, some of which are used for the adhesion of platelets to collagen. When platelets are activated, they express glycoprotein receptors that interact with other platelets, producing aggregation and adhesion. Platelets release cytoplasmic granules such as adenosine diphosphate (ADP), serotonin and thromboxane A2. Adenosine diphosphate (ADP) attracts more platelets to the affected area, serotonin is a vasoconstrictor and thromboxane A2 assists in platelet aggregation, vasoconstriction and degranulation. As more chemicals are released more platelets stick and release their chemicals; creating a platelet plug and continuing the process in a positive feedback loop. 5-Hydroxykynurenamine, a metabolite of serotonin, has been found to inhibit serotonin-induced platelet aggregation. This indicates that it may regulate platelet activity during hemostasis and thrombogenesis by modulating the effects of serotonin on blood clot formation. Platelets alone are responsible for stopping the bleeding of unnoticed wear and tear of our skin on a daily basis. This is referred to as primary hemostasis.
3. Clot formation: Once the platelet plug has been formed by the platelets, the clotting factors (a dozen proteins that travel along the blood plasma in an inactive state) are activated in a sequence of events known as 'coagulation cascade' which leads to the formation of fibrin from inactive fibrinogen plasma protein. Thus, a fibrin mesh is produced all around the platelet plug to hold it in place; this step is called secondary hemostasis. During this process some red and white blood cells are trapped in the mesh which causes the primary hemostasis plug to become harder: the resultant plug is called a thrombus or blood clot. The blood clot contains the secondary hemostasis plug with blood cells trapped in it. This is a necessary step for wound healing, but it has the ability to cause severe health problems if the thrombus becomes detached from the vessel wall and travels through the circulatory system; If it reaches the brain, heart or lungs it could lead to stroke, heart attack, or pulmonary embolism respectively.

== Types ==
Hemostasis can be achieved in various other ways if the body cannot do it naturally (or needs help) during surgery or medical treatment. When the body is under shock and stress, hemostasis is harder to achieve. Though natural hemostasis is most desired, having other means of achieving this is vital for survival in many emergency settings. Without the ability to stimulate hemostasis the risk of hemorrhaging is great. During surgical procedures, the types of hemostasis listed below can be used to control bleeding while avoiding and reducing the risk of tissue destruction. Hemostasis can be achieved by chemical agent as well as mechanical or physical agents. Which hemostasis type used is determined based on the situation.

Developmental Haemostasis refers to the differences in the haemostatic system between children and adults.

== In emergency medicine ==
Debates by physicians and medical practitioners still continue to arise on the subject of hemostasis and how to handle situations with large injuries. If an individual acquires a large injury resulting in extreme blood loss, then a hemostatic agent alone would not be very effective. Medical professionals continue to debate on what the best ways are to assist a patient in a chronic state; however, it is universally accepted that hemostatic agents are the primary tool for smaller bleeding injuries.

Some main types of hemostasis used in emergency medicine include:

- Chemical/topical – This is a topical agent often used in surgery settings to stop bleeding. Microfibrillar collagen is the most popular choice among surgeons [recent source?] because it attracts the patient's natural platelets and starts the blood clotting process when it comes in contact with the platelets. This topical agent requires the normal hemostatic pathway to be properly functional.
- Direct pressure or pressure dressing – This type of hemostasis approach is most commonly used in situations where proper medical attention is not available. Putting pressure and/or dressing to a bleeding wound slows the process of blood loss, allowing for more time to get to an emergency medical setting. Soldiers use this skill during combat when someone has been injured because this process allows for blood loss to be decreased, giving the system time to start coagulation.
- Sutures and ties – Sutures are often used to close an open wound, allowing for the injured area to stay free of pathogens and other unwanted debris to enter the site; however, it is also essential to the process of hemostasis. Sutures and ties allow for skin to be joined back together allowing for platelets to start the process of hemostasis at a quicker pace. Using sutures results in a quicker recovery period because the surface area of the wound has been decreased.
- Physical agents (gelatin sponge) – Gelatin sponges have been indicated as great hemostatic devices. Once applied to a bleeding area, a gelatin sponge quickly stops or reduces the amount of bleeding present. These physical agents are mostly used in surgical settings as well as after surgery treatments. These sponges absorb blood, allow for coagulation to occur faster, and give off chemical responses that decrease the time it takes for the hemostasis pathway to start.

== Disorders ==
The body's hemostasis system requires careful regulation in order to work properly. If the blood does not clot sufficiently, it may be due to bleeding disorders such as hemophilia or immune thrombocytopenia; this requires careful investigation. Over-active clotting can also cause problems; thrombosis, where blood clots form abnormally, can potentially cause embolisms, where blood clots break off and subsequently become lodged in a vein or artery.

Hemostasis disorders can develop for many different reasons. They may be congenital, due to a deficiency or defect in an individual's platelets or clotting factors. A number of disorders can be acquired as well, such as in HELLP syndrome, which is due to pregnancy, or Hemolytic-uremic syndrome (HUS), which is due to E. coli toxins.

== History of artificial hemostasis ==
The process of preventing blood loss from a vessel or organ of the body is referred to as hemostasis. The term comes from the Ancient Greek roots "heme" meaning blood, and "stasis" meaning halting; Put together means the "halting of the blood". The origin of hemostasis dates back as far as ancient Greece; first referenced to being used in the Battle of Troy. It started with the realization that excessive bleeding inevitably equaled death. Vegetable and mineral styptics were used on large wounds by the Greeks and Romans until the takeover of Egypt around 332BC by Greece. At this time many more advances in the general medical field were developed through the study of Egyptian mummification practice, which led to greater knowledge of the hemostatic process. It was during this time that many of the veins and arteries running throughout the human body were found and the directions in which they traveled. Doctors of this time realized if these were plugged, blood could not continue to flow out of the body. Nevertheless, it took until the invention of the printing press during the fifteenth century for medical notes and ideas to travel westward, allowing for the idea and practice of hemostasis to be expanded.

== Research ==
There is currently a great deal of research being conducted on hemostasis. The most current research is based on genetic factors of hemostasis and how it can be altered to reduce the cause of genetic disorders that alter the natural process hemostasis.

Von Willebrand disease is associated with a defect in the ability of the body to create the platelet plug and the fibrin mesh that ultimately stops the bleeding. New research is concluding that the von Willebrand disease is much more common in adolescence. This disease negatively hinders the natural process of Hemostasis causing excessive bleeding to be a concern in patients with this disease. There are complex treatments that can be done including a combination of therapies, estrogen-progesterone preparations, desmopressin, and Von Willebrand factor concentrates. Current research is trying to find better ways to deal with this disease; however, much more research is needed in order to find out the effectiveness of the current treatments and if there are more operative ways to treat this disease.

== See also ==
- Blood tests
- Prothrombin time
- Partial thromboplastin time
