= Heparin cofactor II =

Protein-coding gene in the species Homo sapiens

SERPIND1
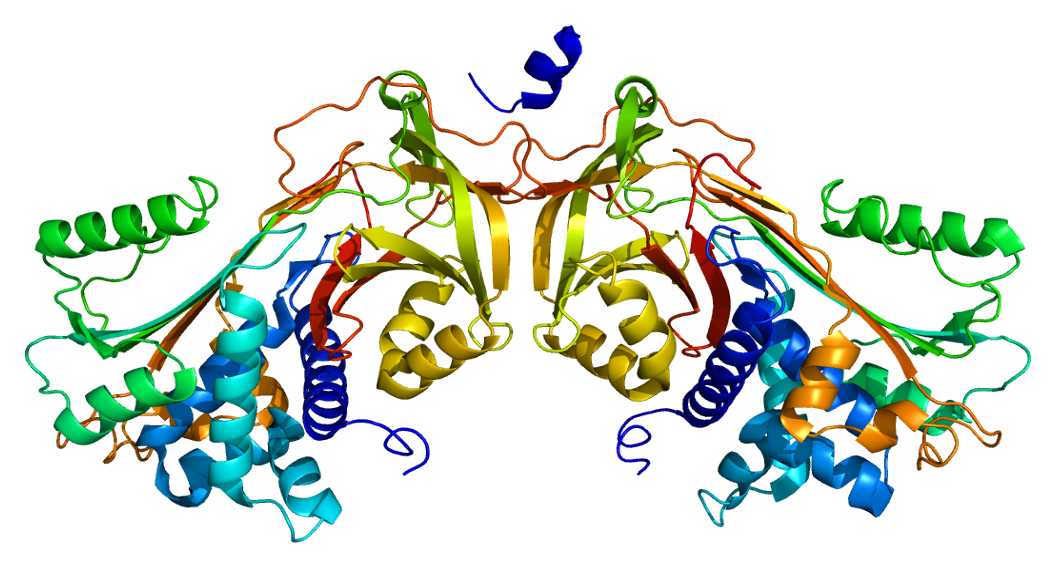

Identifiers
- Aliases: SERPIND1, D22S673, HC2, HCF2, HCII, HLS2, LS2, THPH10, serpin family D member 1
- External IDs: OMIM: 142360; MGI: 96051; GeneCards: SERPIND1
Available structures
PDB	Ortholog search: PDBe RCSB
PDB	List of PDB id codes 1JMO, 1JMJ, 2NAT

Gene location (Human)
Chr.	Chromosome 22 (human)
Band	22q11.21	Start	20,774,113 bp
Band	22q11.21	End	20,787,720 bp

Gene location (Mouse)
Chr.	Chromosome 16 (mouse)
Band	16 A3|16 10.74 cM	Start	17,149,235 bp
Band	16 A3|16 10.74 cM	End	17,161,439 bp
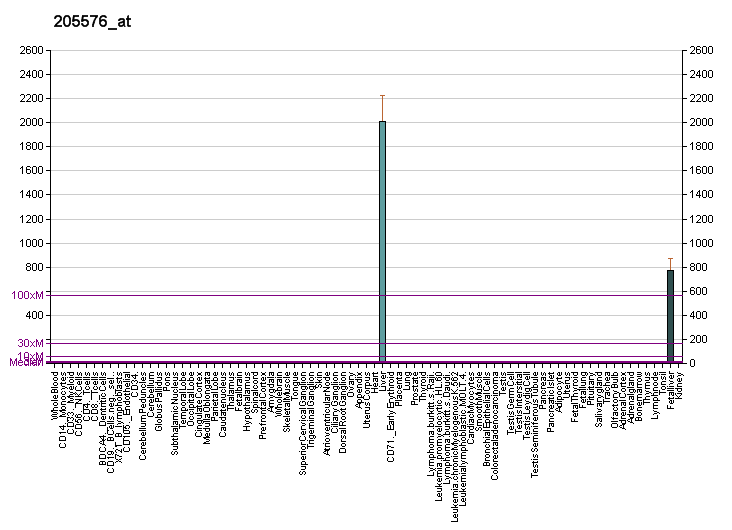
RNA expression pattern
Bgee	Human / Mouse (ortholog); Top expressed in: liver; right lobe of liver; Epithelium of choroid plexus; testicle; trigeminal ganglion; nucleus accumbens; islet of Langerhans; right auricle of heart; left ovary; canal of the cervix / Top expressed in: liver; left lobe of liver; fetal liver hematopoietic progenitor cell; optic nerve; sciatic nerve; gallbladder; human fetus; yolk sac; lens; sexually immature organism; More reference expression data
BioGPS	More reference expression data
Gene ontology
Molecular function	peptidase inhibitor activity; endopeptidase inhibitor activity; heparin binding; serine-type endopeptidase inhibitor activity
Cellular component	extracellular exosome; extracellular space; endoplasmic reticulum lumen; extracellular region
Biological process	negative regulation of peptidase activity; bioluminescence; hemostasis; chemotaxis; blood coagulation; negative regulation of endopeptidase activity; post-translational protein modification
Sources:Amigo / QuickGO
Orthologs
Databases	NCBI: entry; OMA: entry
Species	Human	Mouse
Entrez	3053	15160
Ensembl	ENSG00000099937	ENSMUSG00000022766
UniProt	P05546	P49182
RefSeq (mRNA)	NM_000185	NM_008223; NM_001331047
RefSeq (protein)	NP_000176	NP_001317976; NP_032249
Location (UCSC)	Chr 22: 20.77 – 20.79 Mb	Chr 16: 17.15 – 17.16 Mb
PubMed search
- Wikidata
View/Edit Human	View/Edit Mouse

Heparin cofactor II (HCII), a protein encoded by the SERPIND1 gene, is a coagulation factor that inhibits IIa, and is a cofactor for heparin and dermatan sulfate ("minor antithrombin").

The product encoded by this gene is a serine protease inhibitor which rapidly inhibits thrombin in the presence of dermatan sulfate or heparin. The gene contains five exons and four introns. This protein shares homology with antithrombin III and other members of the alpha-1 antitrypsin superfamily. Mutations in this gene are associated with heparin cofactor II deficiency. Heparin cofactor II deficiency can lead to increased thrombin generation and a hypercoagulable state.

A purification experiment of heparin cofactor II was performed in 1981, in which it was discovered that the purified version of the protein consists of a single polypeptide chain. Further experimentation demonstrated that whether β-Mercaptoethanol is present does not affect HCII's activity in gel electrophoresis. β-Mercaptoethanol is typically used for the reduction of disulfide bonds within a molecule, but the gel electrophoresis revealed that HCII does not have any of these bonds. The structure is similar to antithrombin III (ATIII), which was known to effectively inhibit thrombin as well as coagulation factor X_{a}. This experiment suggested that HCII has strong thrombin inhibition, yet weak inhibition of coagulation factor X_{a}.

Heparin cofactor II may play a role in the immune response, as it has been associated with leukocyte-mediated protein degradation, which releases cytokines in the inflammatory response with neutrophils and monocytes. Its role has been questioned because although it is a thrombin inhibitor, an absence of HCII does not result in significantly higher levels of thrombosis. This does not negate the results of the 1981 study, but novel discoveries create more questions of the biological mechanism and function of the protein. However, this cofactor shows stronger capability in inhibiting thrombin in pregnant women, protecting them from thrombosis. Pregnant women have shown increased levels of heparin cofactor II as well as dermatan sulfate, which is a polysaccharide that is expected to be involved in wound repair, coagulation, and overall maintenance throughout the body. Pregnant women who had thrombosis are likely to also have low levels of heparin cofactor II, but whether this is a causation is still unknown.
