= Zahn infarct =

- Specialty: Hepatology

A Zahn infarct is a pseudo-infarction of the liver, consisting of an area of congestion with parenchymal atrophy but no necrosis, and usually due to obstruction of a branch of the portal vein. Zahn infarcts are unique in that there is collateral congestion of liver sinusoids that do not include areas of anoxia seen in most infarcts. Fibrotic tissue may develop in the area of the infarct and it could be caused by an occlusive phlebitis in portal vein radicles.

== Signs and symptoms ==
Zahn's infarct don't have any specific symptoms.

== Diagnosis ==
Histopathology reveals severe sinusoidal congestion, which is most noticeable at the lobule centers, as well as liver cell atrophy.

== Eponym ==
The Zahn infarct is named for Friedrich Wilhelm Zahn.
