= Albert Zahn House =

Historic house in Baileys Harbor, Wisconsin

- U.S. National Register of Historic Places
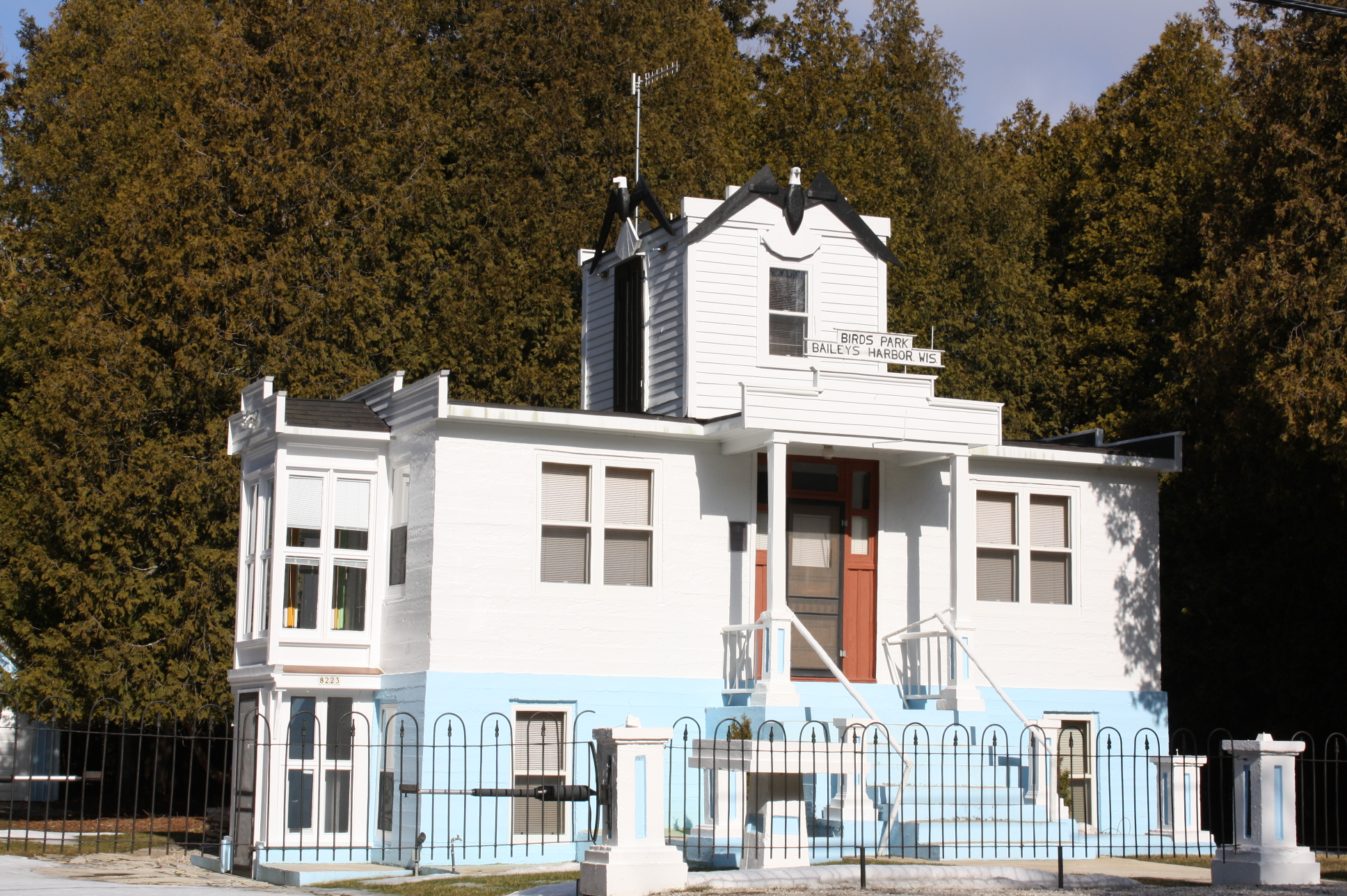
- Albert Zahn House
- Location: 8223 WI Trunk Hwy. 57; Baileys Harbor, Door County, Wisconsin
- Coordinates: 45.0704°N 87.12382°W
- Built: 1924
- NRHP reference No.: 00000492
- Added to NRHP: May 11, 2000

The Albert Zahn House is located in Baileys Harbor, Wisconsin, United States. It was added to the National Register of Historic Places in 2000.

== History ==
The house was built by folk artist Albert Zahn and his wife, Louise. Zahn displayed many of his bird carvings on the property and named it Bird's Park. Other carvings he displayed there include those of other animals and Biblical figures.
