= Friedrich Wilhelm Zahn =

German-Swiss pathologist

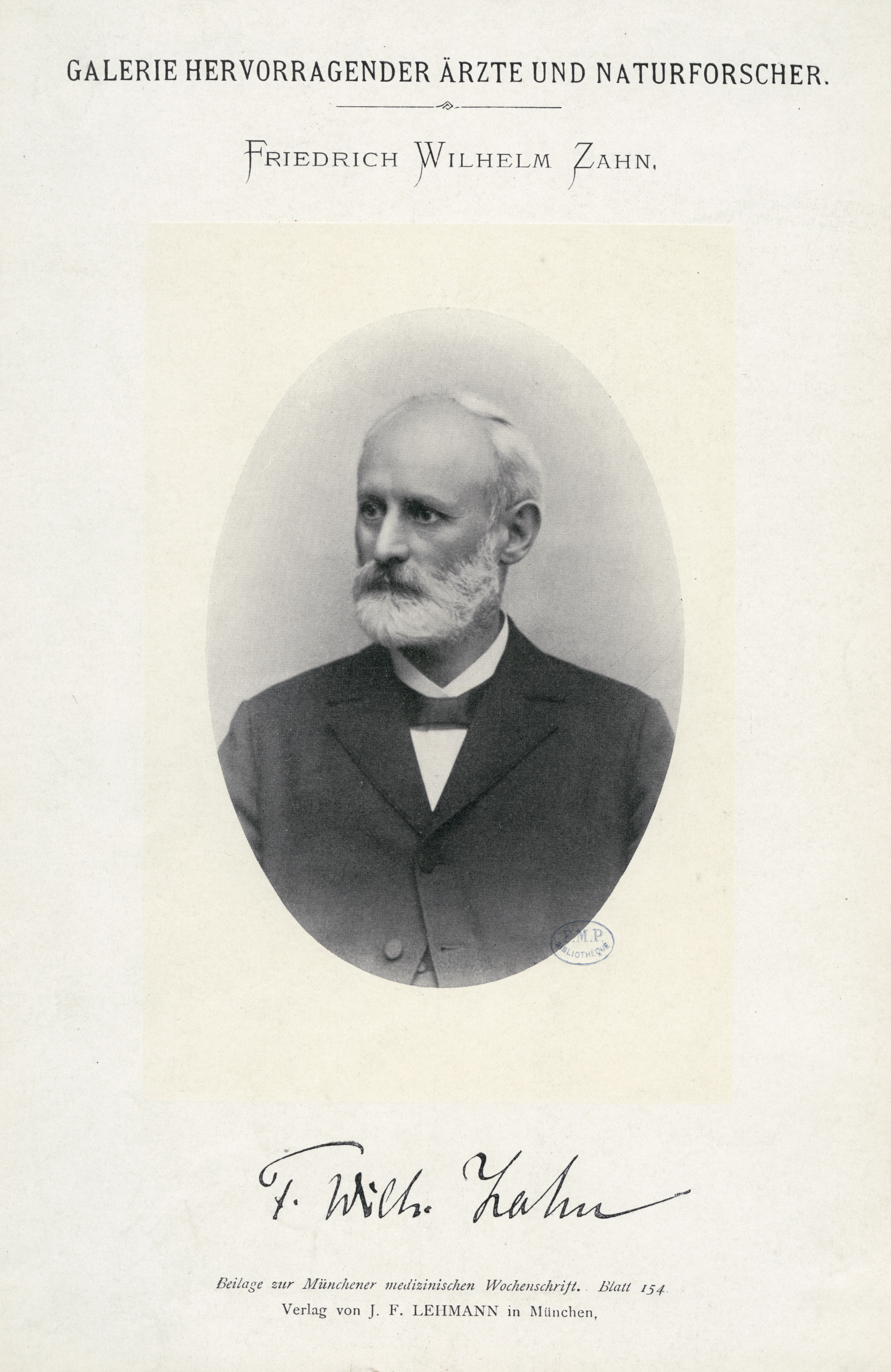
Friedrich Wilhelm Zahn

Friedrich Wilhelm Zahn (14 February 1845 – 1904) was a German-Swiss pathologist born in Germersheim. His eponyms include Zahn infarct and lines of Zahn.

== Life ==
Zahn studied medicine at the University of Strasbourg under Friedrich Daniel von Recklinghausen (1833–1910), becoming an associate professor of pathological anatomy in Geneva in 1876.

Zahn published works on the circulatory system (blood, thrombosis, embolism, arterial disease, etc.) and on tumors. With Georg Albert Lücke (1829–1894), he published an influential treatise involving surgery of tumors, Chirurgie der Geschwülste. Other noted writings by Zahn include:

- Zur Lehre von der Entzündung und Eiterung. Mit besonderer Berücksichtigung der durch das Mikrosporon septicum hervorgerufenen Erscheinungen, 1872 – The doctrine of inflammation and suppuration.
- Tumeur de la partie supérieure du fémur : désarticulation de la hanche, (with Jacques-Louis Reverdin 1842–1929), 1881 – Tumor of the upper part of the femur.
- Beiträge zur Geschwulstlehre (six parts) – Contribution to the study of tumors.
