= Margaret A. Zahn =

American sociologist and criminologist

- Occupation: Professor emerita
- Known for: Criminology
- Awards: Fellow of the American Society of Criminology for Outstanding Lifetime Career Achievement

Academic background
- Education: Ohio State University

Academic work
- Discipline: Sociology, criminology
- Institutions: Temple University; University of North Carolina at Charlotte; North Carolina State University

Margaret A. Zahn is an American sociologist and criminologist at North Carolina State University. She received her PhD in sociology from the Ohio State University in 1969. Zahn has served as president of the American Society of Criminology and has received Fellow of the American Society of Criminology for Outstanding Lifetime Career Achievement.

== Professional career ==
Zahn has served as a professor at multiple universities. She began her tenure-track career at Temple University, where she worked as a professor in the Department of Sociology from 1969 until 1987. From 1987 until 1990, she served as professor and chair for the Department of Sociology, Social Work, and Criminal Justice at Northern Arizona University. At University of North Carolina-Charlotte, Zahn served as chair of the Department of Sociology and Anthropology and as associate dean in the College of Arts and Sciences from 1990 to 1995.

Zahn began working at North Carolina State University (NCSU) in 1995 and is currently emerita professor of sociology. While at NCSU, she has served as dean of the College of Humanities and Social Sciences from 1995 to 2001. While on leave from NCSU, she served in leadership roles for the Violence and Victimization Division and the Office of Research and Evaluation at the National Institute of Justice in Washington, D.C.

Zahn has help multiple positions in the American Society of Criminology and the American Sociological Association. In 1997, she served as president of the American Society of Criminology. From 1999 until 2001, she served on the board of directors of Consortium of Society Sciences Associations.

Zahn retired in 2017. As of 2019, she is professor emerita at NCSU.

== Awards ==
Zahn has received multiple awards including Fellow of the American Society of Criminology for Outstanding Lifetime Career Achievement and the Herbert Bloch Award from the American Society of Criminology. She received the Spivak Award from the American Sociological Society.

== Research and publications ==
Zahn has published multiple peer-reviewed articles and books. She primarily studies violence, girls' delinquency, and homicide. Some of her publications include:

- "Stranger homicides in nine American cities". Journal of Criminal Law and Criminology, 1987.
- "Determining what works for girls in the juvenile justice system: A summary of evaluation evidence". Crime & Delinquency, 2009.
- The Delinquent Girl. Temple University Press, 2009.
- "Causes and correlates of girls' delinquency". Office of Juvenile Justice and Delinquency Prevention. US Department of Justice, 2010.
