= Albert Zahn =

American folk sculptor

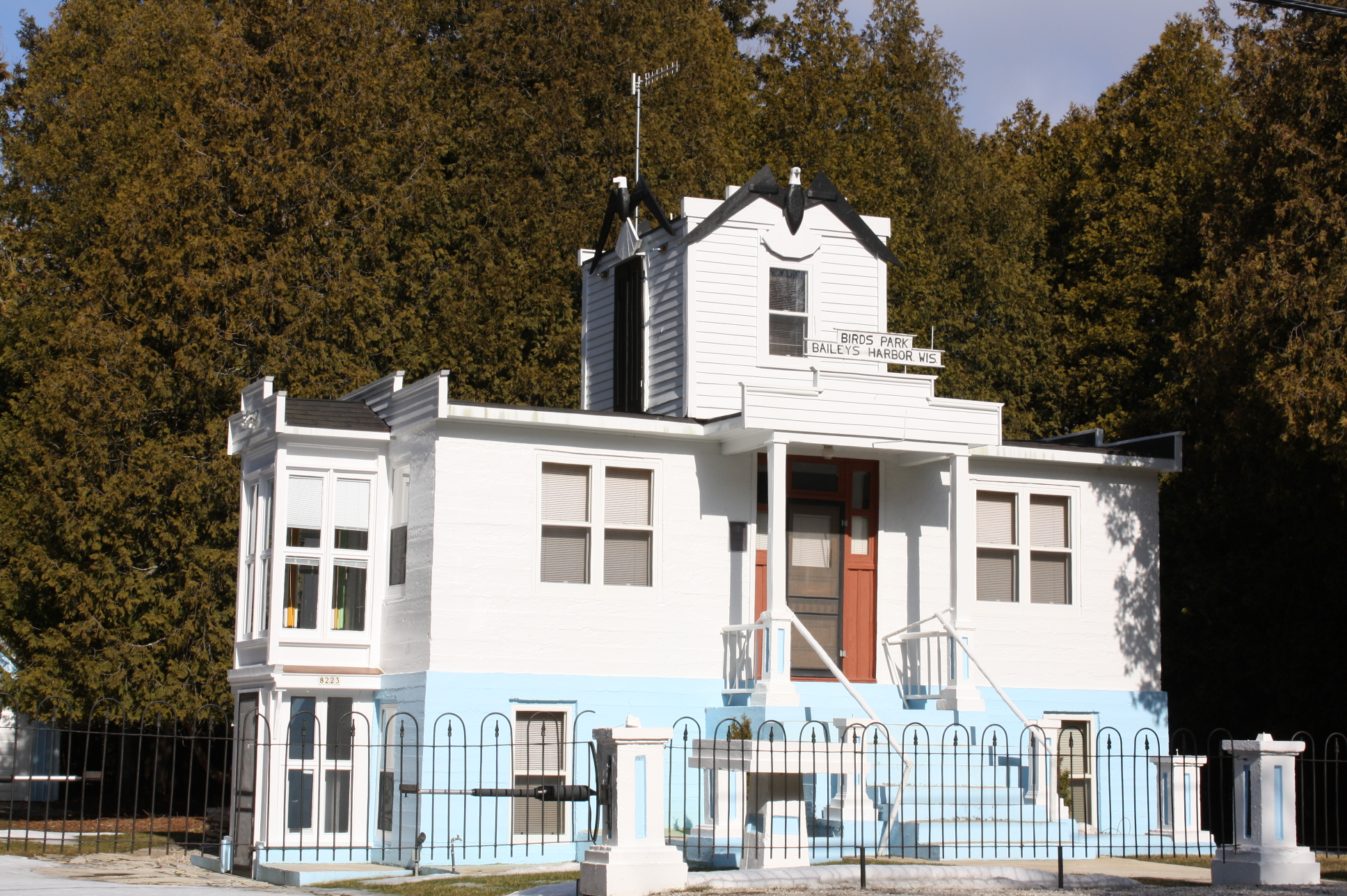
Albert Zahn House, Baileys Harbor, Wisconsin

Albert Zahn was a self-taught sculptor from the Prussian province of Pomerania, who lived and worked in Door County, Wisconsin, United States for most of his life. He is known primarily for his painted wood carvings of birds. He is also known for his depictions of angels, and for the creation of the Albert Zahn House, which he built with his wife Louise Zahn and adorned with hundreds of his carvings. Albert carved most of his sculptures from cedar, and then instructed Louise, who painted them. Some of his other notable subjects include maritime workers, Prussian soldiers, dogs, and deer.

== Life and work ==
Born in 1864 in Pomerania (now part of Germany), Albert Zahn immigrated to the United States as a child, settling in Door County, Wisconsin, where he worked as a farmer. He began his career in the arts after retirement. He was raised Lutheran, and his piety informed most of his sculpture. His relatives have attested to Zahn's familiarity with the Bible, and it is possible to trace significance of almost all of his subjects to Old Testament psalms. Birds held particular significance as a subject for Zahn, earning him the nickname "Birdman of Baileys Harbor".

In 1924 Albert and Louise Zahn built a house in Baileys Harbor, Wisconsin, which he named Birds Park. Now also known as the Albert Zahn House, the property was added to the National Register of Historic Places in 2000. Zahn decorated the house and property extensively with his sculptures. Most of these pieces have now been dispersed into private collections.

Zahn continued to build a large body of work until 1950, when his wife died. He died three years later, in 1953.

Inspired by his work, Albert Zahn's grandson and great-grandson, Ed Zahn and Randy Zahn, both became woodcarvers and often carved the same subjects as Zahn.

== Permanent collections ==
- John Michael Kohler Arts Center, Sheboygan, Wisconsin
- Smithsonian Institution, Washington, D.C.
- Milwaukee Art Museum, Milwaukee, Wisconsin
- Art Institute of Chicago, Chicago, Illinois
- Intuit, Chicago, Illinois
- Carl Hammer Gallery, Chicago, Illinois
