= Yves Zahnd =

Swiss footballer (born 1985)

Personal information
- Date of birth: 4 October 1985 (age 41)
- Place of birth: Switzerland
- Height: 1.93 m (6 ft 4 in)
- Position: Defender

Senior career*
Years	Team	Apps	(Gls)
2006–2010	FC Thun		
2010–2011	SC Kriens	0	(0)
- * Club domestic league appearances and goals

Yves Zahnd (born 4 October 1985) is a Swiss former professional footballer who played as a defender. He played 77 games with FC Thun.

== Career ==
Zahnd played for FC Thun and SC Kriens. Yves Zahnd coached at FC Thun junior teams and then took over for the first time in his career a coaching job at an active team after he was forced to retire in July 2011, due to injury.

He later became a football coach, and was appointed as manager of FC Bern 1894's second-team in May 2013.

== Injury ==
In 2008 the club doctor for FC Thun announced that, though it had already been operated on for a torn ACL and cartilage damage, his knee would probably no longer permit a professional career. Because of this, at the age of 25 Zahnd was forced to retire from professional football due to his extensive knee injury and an associated osteoarthritis.

== Career statistics ==
Appearances and goals by club, season and competition
Club	Season	League			Swiss Cup		Other		Total	
Club	Season	Division	Apps	Goals	Apps	Goals	Apps	Goals	Apps	Goals
FC Thun	2006–07	Swiss Super League	22	1	0	0	0	0	22	1
FC Thun	2007–08	Swiss Super League	15	0	0	0	0	0	15	0
FC Thun	2008–09	Swiss Challenge League	19	0	0	0	0	0	19	0
FC Thun	2009–10	Swiss Challenge League	23	0	1	0	0	0	24	0
FC Thun	Total		79	1	1	0	0	0	80	1
SC Kriens	2010–11	Swiss Challenge League	0	0	0	0	0	0	0	0
Career total			79	1	1	0	0	0	80	1
