= Thrombus permeability =

Thrombus perviousness
- Test of: CT scan

Thrombus permeability reflects the ability of artery-occluding thrombi to let fluid seep into and through them. The more permeable a thrombus, the more fluid it lets through. Permeable thrombi may let more blood pass through to the ischemic brain tissue, and/or have a larger contact surface and histopathology more sensitive for thrombolytic medication. Thus, patients with permeable thrombi may have less brain tissue damage by stroke.

Thrombus perviousness is an imaging biomarker which is used to estimate clot permeability from CT imaging. Thrombus perviousness can be measured using radiological imaging routinely performed in the clinical management of acute ischemic stroke: CT scans without intravenous contrast (also called non-contrast CT, in short NCCT) combined with CT scans after intravenously administered contrast fluid (CT-angiography, in short CTA). The value of thrombus perviousness in acute ischemic stroke treatment is currently being researched.

== Etymology ==
Emilie Santos et al. introduced the term thrombus perviousness in 2016 to estimate thrombus permeability in ischemic stroke patients. Before, Mishra et al. used ‘residual flow within the clot’, and Frölich et al. used ‘antegrade flow across incomplete vessel occlusions’ to describe an estimate of thrombus permeability. Permeability is the physical measure of the ability of a material to transmit fluids over time. To measure thrombus permeability, one needs to measure contrast flow through a clot over time and the pressure drop caused by the occlusion, which is commonly not possible in the acute management of a patient with acute ischemic stroke. Current standard diagnostic protocol for acute ischemic stroke only requires single-phase imaging, visualizing the thrombus at a snapshot in time. Therefore, thrombus perviousness was introduced as a derivative measure of permeability.

== Measurement ==
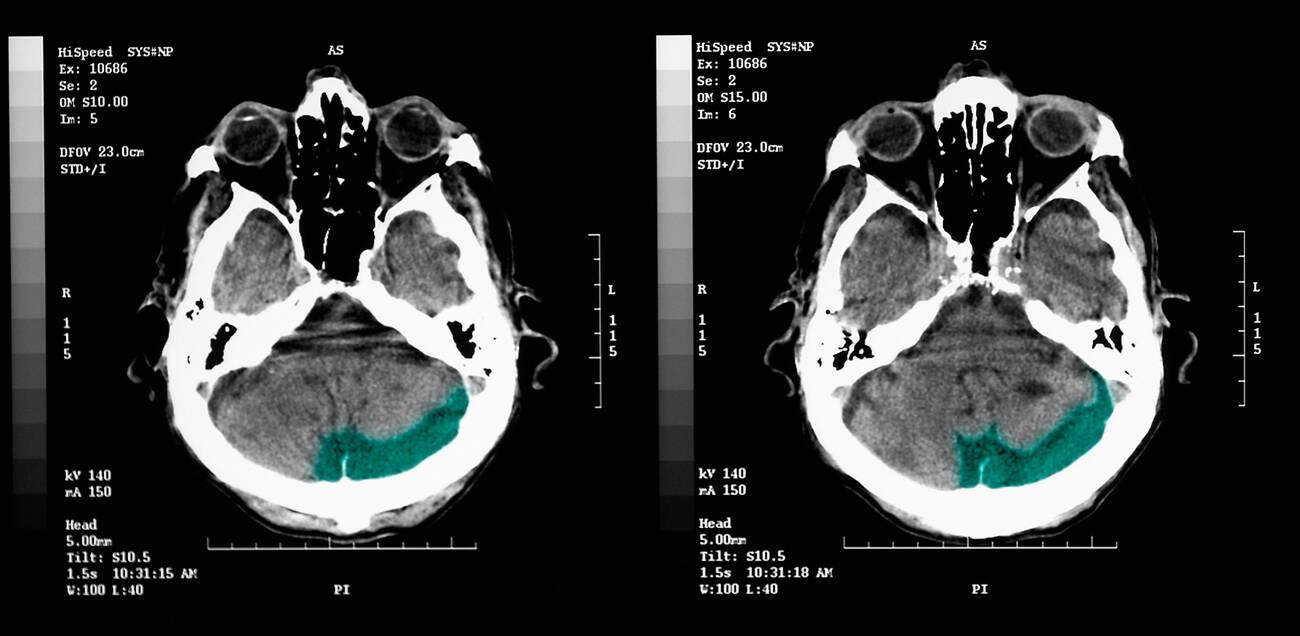
An axial non-contrast CT (NCCT) brain scan profile on a radiology workstation, providing the crucial baseline unenhanced density measurement used to calculate thrombus perviousness.

The amount of contrast that seeps into a thrombus can be quantified by the density difference of thrombi between non-contrast computed tomography (NCCT) and CT angiography (CTA) images. Two measures for thrombus perviousness have been introduced: (1) the void fraction and (2) thrombus attenuation increase (TAI).

=== Void fraction (ε) ===
The void fraction represents the ratio of the void volume within a thrombus, filled with a volume of blood (V_{blood}) and the volume of thrombus material (V_{thrombus}):
$$\text{ε}=\frac{\text{V}_\text{blood}}{\text{V}_\text{thrombus}}$$
Void fraction can be estimated by measuring the attenuation increase (Δ) between NCCT and CTA in the thrombus (Δ_{thrombus}) and in the contralateral artery, filling with contrast on CTA (Δ_{blood}), and subsequently compute the ratio of these Δs:
$$\text{ε}=\frac{\text{ρ}_\text{CTA}\,^\text{thrombus}-\text{ρ}_\text{NCCT}\,^\text{thrombus}}{\text{ρ}_\text{CTA}\,^\text{blood}-\text{ρ}_\text{NCCT}\,^\text{blood}}=\frac{\text{Δ}_\text{thrombus}}{\text{Δ}_\text{blood}}$$

=== Thrombus attenuation increase ===
To measure TAI, the mean attenuation (density, in Hounsfield Units) of a clot is measured on NCCT (ρ_{thrombus^{NCCT}}) and subtracted from the thrombus density measured on CTA (ρ_{thrombus^{CTA}}). CTA thrombus density increases after administration of the high-density contrast fluid used in CTA:

Δ_{thrombus} = ρ_{thrombus^{CTA}} – ρ_{thrombus^{NCCT}}

A manual (volume of interest [ROI]-based) and semi-automated (full thrombus segmentation) method have been described to measure thrombus density.

==== Manual 3-ROI TAI assessment ====
In the manual thrombus perviousness assessment, spherical ROIs with a diameter of 2 mm are manually placed in the thrombus, both on NCCT and CTA. To improve reflection of possible thrombus heterogeneity, three ROIs are placed per imaging modality rather than one. The average of every three ROIs is calculated and used as ρ_{thrombus^{NCCT}} and ρ_{thrombus^{CTA}}.

==== Semi-automated full thrombus segmentation ====
In automated measurements, the thrombus on CTA images is semi-automatically segmented in three steps.

1. An observer places four seed points. The first two are placed in the vasculature ipsilateral to (on the same side as) the occlusion, one proximal and one distal to the clot. The second two are placed in the contralateral vasculature (on the opposite side), both at approximately the same height as the first two points. The automated method subsequently segments the contralateral vasculature using these seed points.
2. The segmentation of the contralateral side is mapped to the occluded artery, using mirror symmetry, to segment the occluded artery.
3. The thrombus is segmented using intensity based region growing.
4. Finally, the density distribution of the entire thrombus in NCCT is compared to that in CTA to calculate thrombus attenuation increase (Δ).

==== Comparison between 3-ROI and semi-automated full thrombus measurement ====
It has been shown that manual measurement tends to overestimate actual entire thrombus density, especially in low-density thrombi. Measurements based on the full thrombus show a wider variety of thrombus densities and better discrimination of high- and low-density thrombi and shows a stronger correlation with outcome measures than measurements based on 3 ROIs.

== Influence of imaging parameters ==
TAI measurements performed on CT scans with thicker slices will be less accurate, because volume averaging results in a reduction of thrombus density on NCCT. Therefore, it has been suggested to only use thin-slice CT images (≤2.5 mm) to measure thrombus perviousness.

== Additional permeability measures ==
Alternative measures of similar thrombus permeability characteristics have been introduced and are still being introduced. Mishra et al. introduced the residual flow grade, which distinguishes no contrast penetration (grade 0); contrast permeating diffusely through thrombus (grade 1); and tiny hairline lumen or streak of well-defined contrast within the thrombus extending either through its entire length or part of the thrombus (grade 2).

== Clinical relevance ==
Currently, treatment for acute ischemic stroke due to an occlusion of one of the arteries of the proximal anterior intracranial circulation consists of intravenous thrombolysis followed by endovascular thrombectomy for patients that arrive at the hospital within 4.5 hours of stroke onset. Patients that arrive later than 4.5 hours after onset, or have contra-indications for intravenous thrombolysis can still be eligible for endovascular thrombectomy only. Even with treatment, not all patients recover after their stroke; many are left with permanent brain damage. Increased thrombus perviousness may decrease brain damage during stroke by allowing more blood to reach the ischemic tissue. Furthermore, level of perviousness may reflect histopathological composition of clots or size of contact surface for thrombolytic medication, thereby influencing effectiveness of thrombolysis.

== Thrombus perviousness in research ==
A number of studies has been conducted on the effects of thrombus perviousness on NCCT and CTA. In addition, dynamic imaging modalities have been used to investigate thrombus perviousness/permeability in animal and laboratory studies and in humans using digital subtraction angiography (DSA) and CT Perfusion/4D-CTA. 4D-CTA may enable more accurate measurement of TAI, since it overcomes the influence of varying scan timing and contrast arrival in single phase CTA.
