= Lines of Zahn =

Tissue damage caused by thrombosis

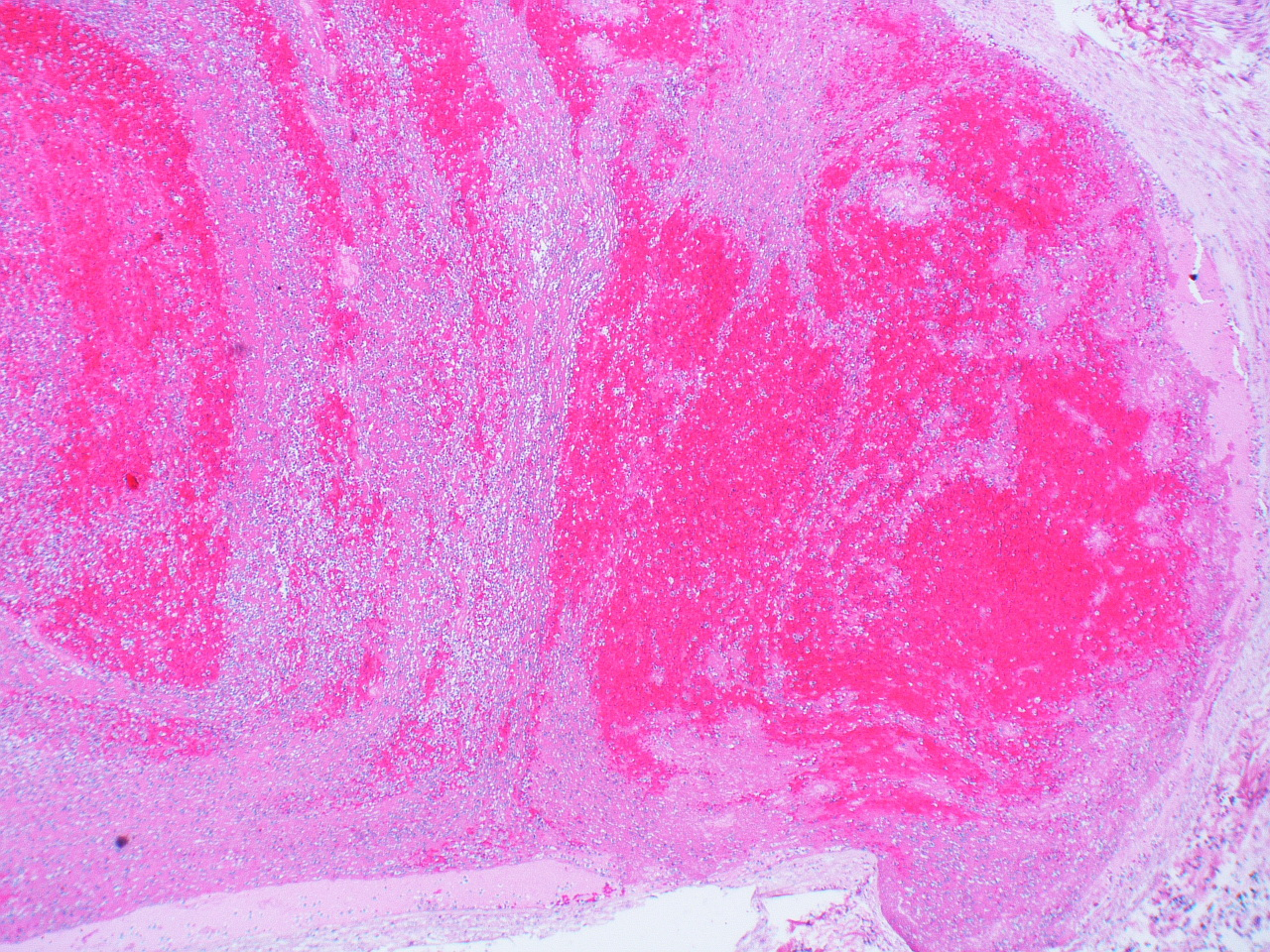
- A recent pulmonary thrombo-embolus with prominent lines of Zahn. The pale areas consist of fibrin and platelets, while the red areas consist of erythrocytes.
- Specialty: Pathology
- Causes: Thrombosis

Lines of Zahn are a characteristic of thrombi. They have multiple layers, with their lighter layers consisting of platelets and fibrin and their darker layers consisting of red blood cells. They are more present on thrombi formed with faster blood flow, especially on thrombi from the heart and aorta. They are only seen on thrombi formed before death. They are named after German–Swiss pathologist Friedrich Wilhelm Zahn.

== Definition ==
Lines of Zahn are a characteristic of thrombi. They have visible and microscopic alternating layers (laminations). Platelets mixed with fibrin form lighter layers. Red blood cells form darker layers. Sometimes, the term "lines of Zahn" only refers to the lighter layers.

== Evaluation ==
Lines of Zahn can be used to confirm diagnosis of a thrombus. Their presence implies thrombosis at a site of rapid blood flow that happened before death. They are more common in thrombi formed in the heart or aorta. In veins or smaller arteries, where flow is not as constant, they occur less frequently. They are also only seen on thrombi formed when blood is flowing. This is a distinguishing marker between thrombi that formed before death and after death.

== History ==
Lines of Zahn are named after German–Swiss pathologist Friedrich Wilhelm Zahn.

== Additional images ==
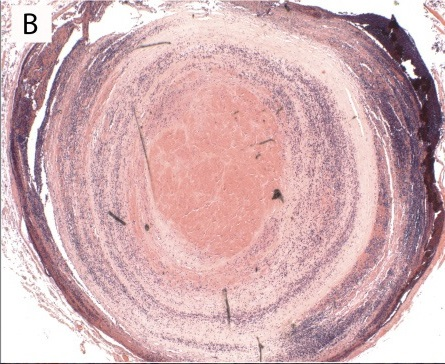
Thrombus showing circumferential lines of Zahn.

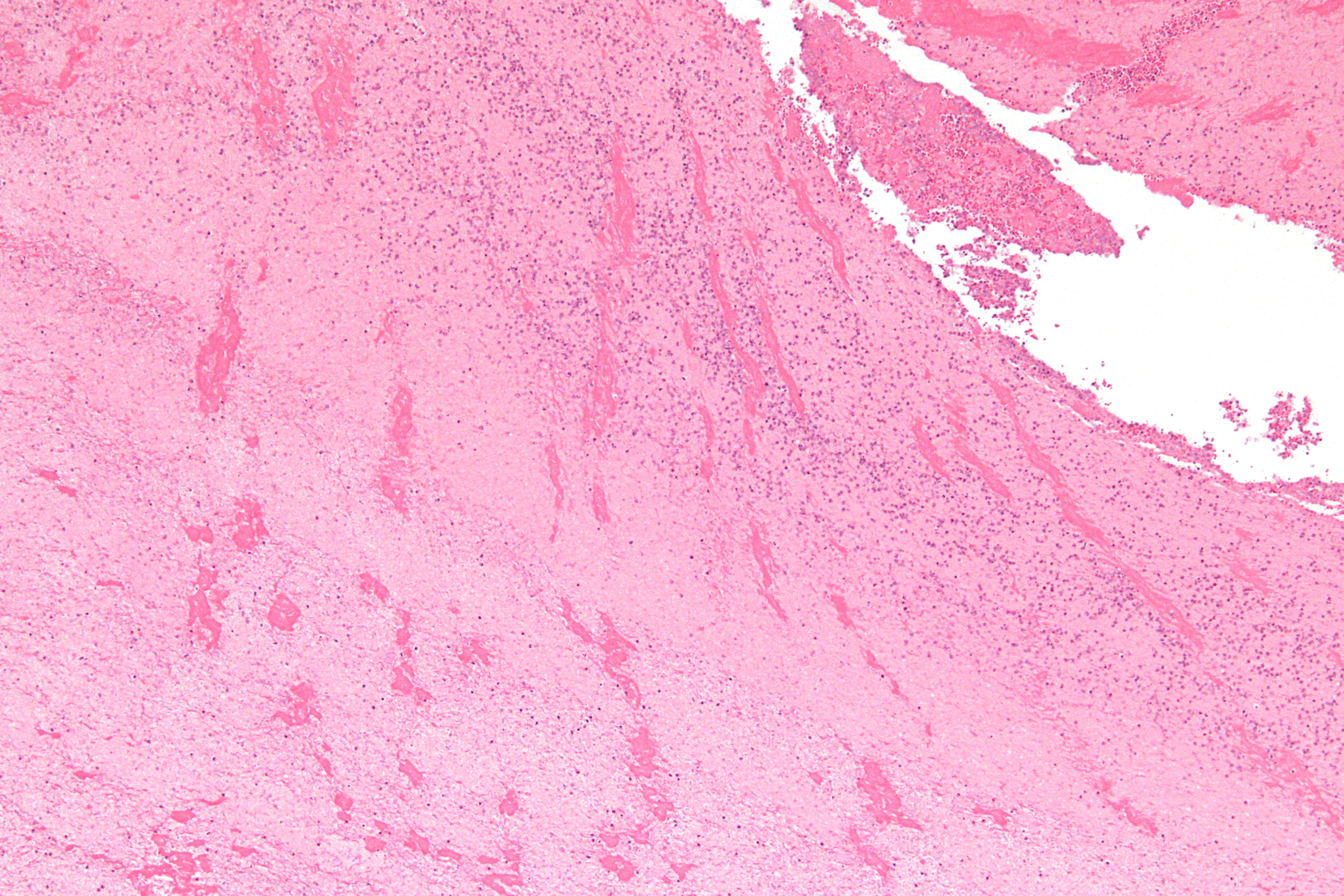
Low magnification micrograph showing laminations in a thrombus in a fatal pulmonary embolism. H&E stain.

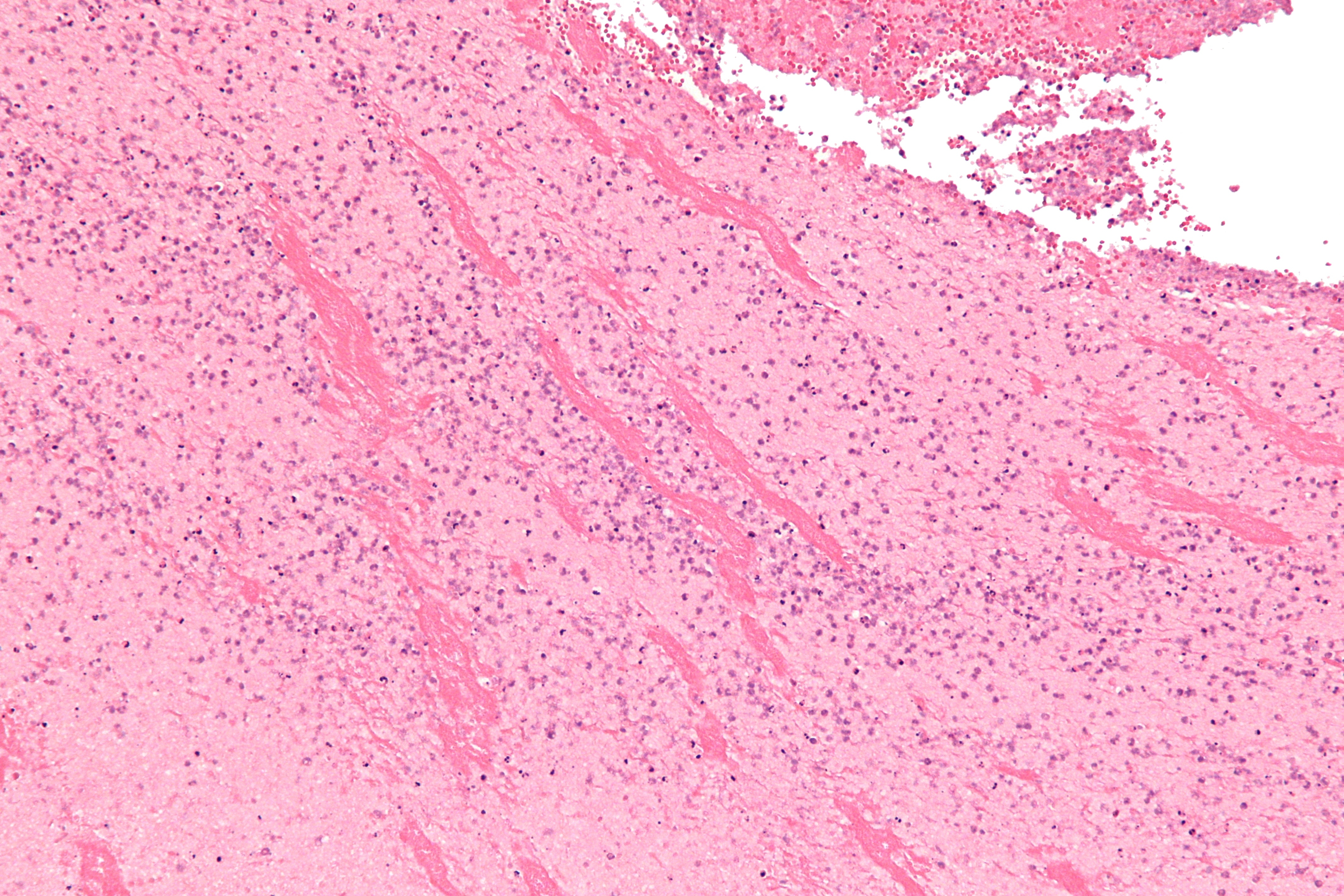
Intermediate magnification micrograph showing laminations in a thrombus in a fatal pulmonary embolism. H&E stain.

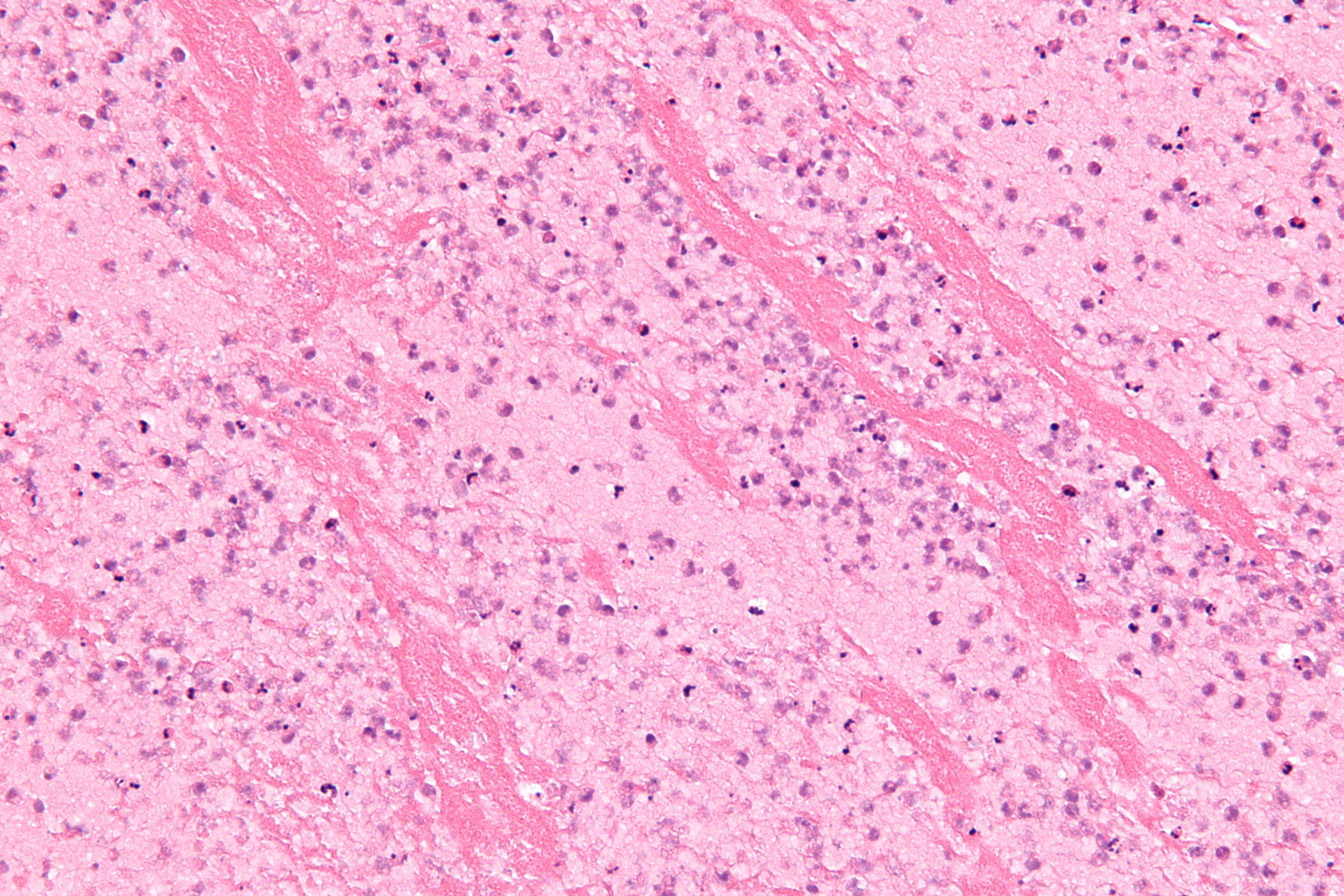
High magnification micrograph showing laminations in a thrombus in a fatal pulmonary embolism. H&E stain.
