= Kunitz =

Kunitz is the surname of several people:

- Chris Kunitz (born 1979), a Canadian professional ice hockey player
- Jaana Kunitz (Yaana Kunitz; born 1972), an award-winning ballroom dancer and fitness program creator
- Matt Kunitz (born 1968), a television executive producer
- Moses Kunitz (1887–1978), a Russian-American biochemist
- Stanley Kunitz (1905–2006), an American poet

== See also ==
- Kunitz domain, a protein domain
  - Kunitz STI protease inhibitor
