= Antinutrient =

Compound that affects the absorption of nutrients

Phytic acid (deprotonated phytate anion in the picture) is an antinutrient that interferes with the absorption of minerals from the diet.

Antinutrients or anti-nutritional factors (ANFs) are natural or synthetic compounds that interfere with the absorption of nutrients. Nutrition studies focus on antinutrients commonly found in food sources and beverages. Antinutrients may take the form of drugs, chemicals that naturally occur in food sources, proteins, or overconsumption of nutrients themselves. Antinutrients may act by binding to vitamins and minerals, preventing their uptake, or inhibiting enzymes.

Throughout history, humans have bred crops to reduce antinutrients, and cooking processes have developed to remove them from raw food materials and increase nutrient bioavailability, notably in staple foods such as cassava.

Antinutrients may also be therapeutic, such as in the case of anti-diabetic drug Acarbose or anti-obesity drug Orlistat, both of which reduce effective caloric intake.

== Mechanisms ==
=== Preventing mineral uptake ===
Phytic acid has a strong binding affinity to minerals such as calcium, magnesium, iron, copper, and zinc. This results in precipitation, making the minerals unavailable for absorption in the intestines. Phytic acids are common in the hulls of nuts, seeds, and grains and of great importance in agriculture, animal nutrition, and in eutrophication, due to the mineral chelation and bound phosphates released into the environment. Without the need to use milling to reduce phytate (including nutrient), the amount of phytic acid is commonly reduced in animal feeds by adding histidine acid phosphate type of phytases to them.

Oxalic acid and oxalates are present in many plants and in significant amounts particularly in rhubarb, tea, spinach, parsley, and purslane. Oxalates bind to calcium, magnesium and iron, preventing their absorption in the human body.

Glucosinolates prevent the uptake of iodine, affecting the function of the thyroid and thus are considered goitrogens. They are found in plants such as broccoli, Brussels sprouts, cabbage, mustard greens, radishes, and cauliflower.

=== Enzyme inhibition ===
Protease inhibitors are substances that inhibit the actions of trypsin, pepsin, and other proteases in the gut, preventing the digestion and subsequent absorption of protein. For example, Bowman–Birk trypsin inhibitor and Kunitz STI protease inhibitor are found in soybeans. Some trypsin inhibitors and lectins are found in legumes and interfere with digestion.

Lipase inhibitors interfere with enzymes, such as human pancreatic lipase, that catalyze the hydrolysis of some lipids, including fats. For example, the anti-obesity drug orlistat causes a percentage of fat to pass through the digestive tract undigested.

Amylase inhibitors prevent the action of enzymes that break the glycosidic bonds of starches and other complex carbohydrates, preventing the release of simple sugars and absorption by the body. Like lipase inhibitors, they have been used as a diet aid and obesity treatment. They are present in many types of beans; commercially available amylase inhibitors are extracted from white kidney beans.

Hypoglycin A, which is contained in lychees and ackee fruit, blocks the fatty acid metabolism, so that the body uses its glycogen deposits for energy, which can cause hypoglycemia, when these fruit are eaten in large quantities or as the sole diet.

Coprine found in some edible mushrooms, for example the common inkcap, inhibits the aldehyde dehydrogenase, which is a part of the alcohol digestive system. This can cause a buildup of the toxic acetaldehyde. Therefore, mushrooms containing coprine should never be consumed together with alcoholic beverages.

=== Other ===
Excessive intake of required nutrients can also result in them having an anti-nutrient action. Excessive intake of dietary fiber can reduce the transit time through the intestines to such a degree that other nutrients cannot be absorbed. However, this effect is often not seen in practice and reduction of absorbed minerals can be attributed mainly to the phytic acids in fibrous food. Foods high in calcium eaten simultaneously with foods containing iron can decrease the absorption of iron via an unclear mechanism involving iron transport protein hDMT1, which calcium can inhibit.

Avidin is an antinutrient found in active form in raw egg whites. It binds very tightly to biotin (vitamin B_{7}) and can cause deficiency of B_{7} in animals and, in extreme cases, in humans.

A widespread form of antinutrients, the flavonoids, are a group of polyphenolic compounds that include tannins. These compounds chelate metals such as iron and zinc and reduce the absorption of these nutrients, and they also inhibit digestive enzymes and may also precipitate proteins.

Saponins in plants may act like antifeedants and can be classified as antinutrients.

== Occurrence and removal ==
Antinutrients are found at some level in almost all foods for a variety of reasons. However, their levels are reduced in modern crops, probably as an outcome of the process of domestication. The possibility now exists to eliminate antinutrients entirely using genetic engineering; however, since antinutrients may also have beneficial effects, such genetic modifications would not necessarily improve overall health, despite making food more nutritious.

Many traditional methods of food preparation such as germination, cooking, fermentation, and malting increase the nutritive quality of plant foods through reducing certain antinutrients such as phytic acid, polyphenols, and oxalic acid. Such processing methods are widely used in societies where cereals and legumes form a major part of the diet. An important example of such processing is the fermentation of cassava to produce cassava flour: this fermentation reduces the levels of both toxins and antinutrients in the tuber.

== See also ==
- Antimetabolite
- Bioenhancer
- Biopesticide
- Plant defense against herbivory
