= ST14 =

Protein-coding gene in the species Homo sapiens

Identifiers
- Aliases: ST14, ARCI11, HAI, MT-SP1, MTSP1, PRSS14, SNC19, TADG15, TMPRSS14, suppression of tumorigenicity 14, ST14 transmembrane serine protease matriptase, CAP3
- External IDs: OMIM: 606797; MGI: 1338881; GeneCards: ST14
Available structures
PDB	Ortholog search: PDBe RCSB
PDB	List of PDB id codes 1EAW, 1EAX, 2GV6, 2GV7, 3BN9, 3NCL, 3P8F, 3P8G, 3SO3, 4IS5, 4ISL, 4ISN, 4ISO, 4JYT, 4JZ1, 4JZI, 4O97, 4O9V, 4R0I
Enzyme activity
EC #	BRENDA	ExPASy	KEGG	MetaCyc
3.4.21.109	↗	↗	↗	↗

Gene location (Human)
Chr.	Chromosome 11 (human)
Band	11q24.3	Start	130,159,782 bp
Band	11q24.3	End	130,210,362 bp

Gene location (Mouse)
Chr.	Chromosome 9 (mouse)
Band	9 A4|9 16.61 cM	Start	31,000,698 bp
Band	9 A4|9 16.61 cM	End	31,043,149 bp
RNA expression pattern
Bgee	Human / Mouse (ortholog); Top expressed in: mucosa of transverse colon; nasal epithelium; duodenum; mucosa of ileum; mucosa of pharynx; jejunal mucosa; olfactory zone of nasal mucosa; rectum; gingival epithelium; mucosa of sigmoid colon / Top expressed in: hair follicle; intestinal villus; crypt of lieberkuhn of small intestine; gastric mucosa; mucous cell of stomach; large intestine; colon; epithelium of stomach; lip; Eustachian tube; More reference expression data
BioGPS	n/a
Gene ontology
Molecular function	peptidase activity; serine-type peptidase activity; hydrolase activity; endopeptidase activity; serine-type endopeptidase activity
Cellular component	integral component of membrane; extracellular region; plasma membrane; basolateral plasma membrane; integral component of plasma membrane; extrinsic component of plasma membrane; membrane; extracellular space
Biological process	neural tube closure; epithelial cell morphogenesis involved in placental branching; proteolysis; keratinocyte differentiation; cornification
Sources:Amigo / QuickGO
Orthologs
Databases	NCBI: entry; OMA: entry
Species	Human	Mouse
Entrez	6768	19143
Ensembl	ENSG00000149418	ENSMUSG00000031995
UniProt	Q9Y5Y6	P56677
RefSeq (mRNA)	NM_021978	NM_011176
RefSeq (protein)	NP_068813	NP_035306
Location (UCSC)	Chr 11: 130.16 – 130.21 Mb	Chr 9: 31 – 31.04 Mb
PubMed search
- Wikidata
View/Edit Human	View/Edit Mouse

Suppressor of tumorigenicity 14 protein, also known as matriptase, is a protein that in humans is encoded by the ST14 gene. ST14 orthologs have been identified in most mammals for which complete genome data are available.

== Function ==
Matriptase is an epithelial-derived, integral membrane serine protease. This protease forms a complex with the Kunitz-type serine protease inhibitor, HAI-1, and is found to be activated by sphingosine-1-phosphate. This protease has been shown to cleave and activate hepatocyte growth factor/scatter factor, and urokinase plasminogen activator, which suggest the function of this protease as an epithelial membrane activator for other proteases and latent growth factors.

Matriptase is a type II transmembrane serine protease expressed in most human epithelia, where it is coexpressed with its cognate transmembrane inhibitor, hepatocyte growth factor activator inhibitor (HAI)-1. Activation of the matriptase zymogen requires sequential N-terminal cleavage, activation site autocleavage, and transient association with HAI-1. Matriptase has an essential physiological role in profilaggrin processing, corneocyte maturation, and lipid matrix formation associated with terminal differentiation of the oral epithelium and the epidermis, and is also critical for hair follicle growth. Matriptase is an 80- to 90-kDa cell surface glycoprotein with a complex modular structure that is common to all matriptases.

== Clinical significance ==
The expression of this protease has been associated with breast, colon, prostate, and ovarian tumors, which implicates its role in cancer invasion, and metastasis.

Matriptase and HAI expression are frequently dysregulated in human cancer, and matriptase expression that is unopposed by HAI-1 potently promotes carcinogenesis and metastatic dissemination in animal models.
