= BF9 =

Toxin from snake

Toxin BF9 is a Kunitz-type peptide, coming from snakes, with a dual functionality. The toxin is able to inhibit both serine proteases and potassium channels (more specifically the K_{v}1.3 channel).

== Etymology and source ==
Venom basic protease inhibitor IX, also named BF9, is derived from the venom of the elapid snake Bungarus fasciatus. The ‘BF’ in the name originates from the snake's nomenclature. This Kunitz-type peptide is the first functionally characterized snake toxin that inhibits both proteases and potassium channels.

== Chemistry ==
The protein structure of BF9 has a length of 65 amino acid residues. Three of these residues are acidic and nine are basic. The basic residues of the protein are critical in forming the ‘functional dyad', which is a well-defined pair of amino acid residues that is essential for the protein’s function. This ‘functional dyad’ is necessary to affect potassium channels. The amino acid sequence of BF9 is the following:

‘KNRPTFCNLLPETGRCNALIPAFYYNSHLHKCQKFNYGGCGGNANNFKTIDECQRTCAAKYGRSS’.

== Target and mode of action ==
For the recognition of K_{v}1 potassium channels, the Kunitz-type toxins from snakes mainly use N-terminal residues. To interact specifically with the K_{v}1.3 channels, based on sequence and structural comparative analysis with other Kunitz-type toxins, it is suggested that BF9 uses both its N-terminal and C-terminal residues. The N-terminal residues involved are K1, R3, F6, L9, and L10. The C-terminal residues that are involved are R55, K60, and K63. These residues together form a molecular mechanism to interact with K_{v}1.3 channels. Due to this interaction, BF9 inhibits K_{v}1.3 channels with an IC50 value of 120.0 nM.

Besides blocking K_{v}1.3 potassium channels, BF9 also acts as a serine protease inhibitor by interacting with specific proteases, such as alpha-chymotrypsin. This inhibition is achieved by BF9 cleaving Asn17 at the P1 site of the target peptide. This P1 site of the target peptide interacts with the active site of a protease. BF9 is the first identified snake toxin capable of inhibiting both potassium channels and serine proteases.

== Therapeutic use ==
K_{v}1.3 channels are among others expressed in T-cells. Therefore, if these channels are inhibited, the effector-memory T-cells are affected.

The overexpression of K_{v}1.3 channels in T-cells can lead to autoimmune diseases, and a higher level of factor XIa can lead to thrombosis. Using its properties, BF9 can potentially be used as a treatment drug that targets the K_{v}1.3 channels and the XIa coregulation factor.
