= Eppin =

Protein found in humans

EPPIN

Identifiers
- Aliases: EPPIN, CT71, CT72, SPINLW1, WAP7, WFDC7, dJ461P17.2, epididymal peptidase inhibitor
- External IDs: OMIM: 609031; MGI: 2684968; GeneCards: EPPIN

Gene location (Human)
Chr.	Chromosome 20 (human)
Band	20q13.12	Start	45,540,626 bp
Band	20q13.12	End	45,547,752 bp

Gene location (Mouse)
Chr.	Chromosome 2 (mouse)
Band	2|2 H3	Start	164,421,439 bp
Band	2|2 H3	End	164,427,367 bp
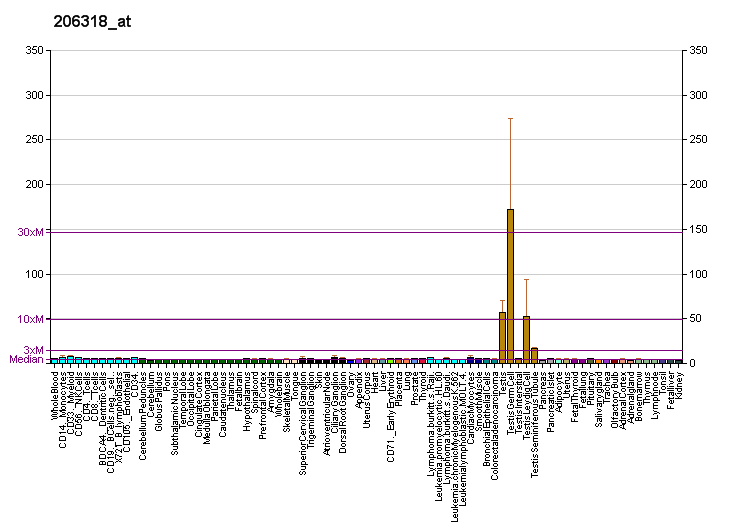

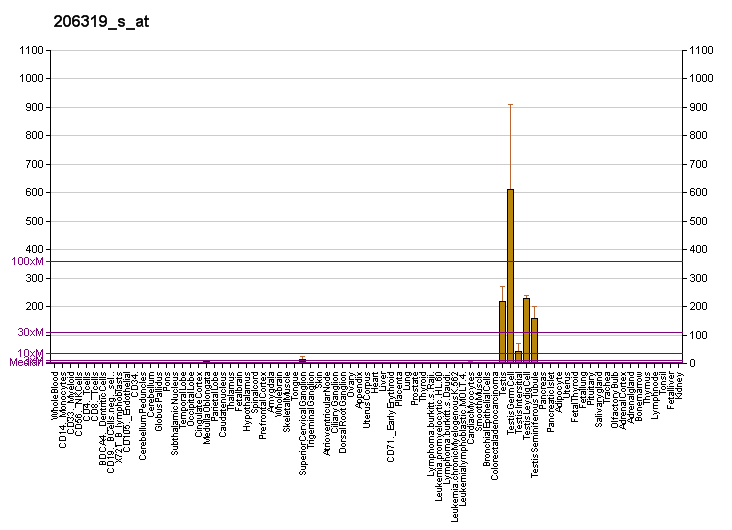
RNA expression pattern
Bgee	Human / Mouse (ortholog); Top expressed in: right testis; corpus epididymis; left testis; buccal mucosa cell; epithelium of bronchus; bronchial epithelial cell; tail of epididymis; mucosa of paranasal sinus; olfactory zone of nasal mucosa; gonad / Top expressed in: testicle; spermatocyte; urinary bladder; lung; spermatid; ovary; adrenal gland; uterus; white adipose tissue; stomach; More reference expression data
BioGPS	More reference expression data
Gene ontology
Molecular function	peptidase inhibitor activity; protein binding; serine-type endopeptidase inhibitor activity
Cellular component	extracellular region; cell surface; extracellular space; sperm plasma membrane; protein-containing complex
Biological process	negative regulation of calcium ion import; negative regulation of peptidase activity; defense response to bacterium; protein complex oligomerization; negative regulation of endopeptidase activity; negative regulation of flagellated sperm motility; antimicrobial humoral response
Sources:Amigo / QuickGO
Orthologs
Databases	NCBI: entry; OMA: entry
Species	Human	Mouse
Entrez	57119	209351
Ensembl	ENSG00000101448	ENSMUSG00000074595
UniProt	O95925	Q3UW55
RefSeq (mRNA)	NM_181502; NM_001302861; NM_020398	NM_001033240; NM_001177848
RefSeq (protein)	NP_001289790; NP_065131; NP_001185915	NP_001028412; NP_001171319
Location (UCSC)	Chr 20: 45.54 – 45.55 Mb	Chr 2: 164.42 – 164.43 Mb
PubMed search
- Wikidata
View/Edit Human	View/Edit Mouse

Eppin (or epididymal peptidase inhibitor) is a protein that in humans is encoded by the EPPIN gene (previously SPINLW1).

This gene encodes an epididymal protease inhibitor, which contains both kunitz-type and WAP-type four-disulfide core (WFDC) protease inhibitor consensus sequences. Most WFDC genes are localized to chromosome 20q12-q13 in two clusters: centromeric and telomeric. This gene is a member of the WFDC gene family and belongs to the telomeric cluster. Alternatively spliced transcript variants encoding distinct isoforms have been found for this gene.
