= Protease inhibitor =

Protease inhibitor can refer to:

- Protease inhibitor (pharmacology): a class of medication that inhibits viral protease
- Protease inhibitor (biology): molecules that inhibit proteases
