= Pacifastin =

Pacifastin_I
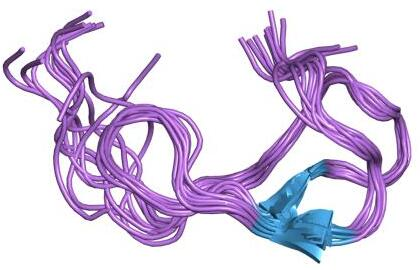
- solution structure of the small serine protease inhibitor sgci[l30r, k31m]

Identifiers
- Symbol: Pacifastin_I
- Pfam: PF05375
- InterPro: IPR008037
- SCOP2: 1kgm / SCOPe / SUPFAM
Available protein structures:
- PDB: IPR008037 PF05375 (ECOD; PDBsum)
- AlphaFold: IPR008037; PF05375

Pacifastin is a family of serine proteinase inhibitors found in arthropods. Pacifastin inhibits the serine peptidases trypsin and chymotrypsin.

All pacifastin members that have been characterized at the molecular level are precursor peptides composed of an N-terminal signal sequence followed by a precursor domain and a variable number of inhibitor domains. Each of these inhibitor domains carries a six-cysteine motif – see below.

The first family members to be identified were isolated from Locusta migratoria migratoria (migratory locust) which were HI, LMCI-1 (PMP-D2) and LMCI-2 (PMP-C). A further five members, SGPI-1 to 5, were then isolated from Schistocerca gregaria (desert locust), and a heterodimeric serine protease inhibitor was isolated from the haemolymph of Pacifastacus leniusculus (Signal crayfish), and named pacifastin.

== Function ==
Peptide proteinase inhibitors are in many cases synthesised as part of a larger precursor protein, referred to as a propeptide or zymogen, which remains inactive until the precursor domain is cleaved off in the lysosome, the precursor domain preventing access of the substrate to the active site until necessary. Proteinase inhibitors destined for secretion have an additional N-terminal signal-peptide domain which will be cleaved by a signal-peptidase. Removal of these one or two N-terminal inhibitor domains, either by interaction with a second peptidase or by autocatalytic cleavage, will activate the zymogen.

Very little is known about the endogenous function of pacifastin-like inhibitors except that they may play roles in arthropod immunity and in regulation of the physiological processes involved in insect reproduction.

== Structure ==
The inhibitor unit of pacifastin is a conserved pattern of six cysteine residues (Cys1 – Xaa9–12 – Cys2 – Asn – Xaa – Cys3 – Xaa – Cys4 – Xaa2–3 – Gly – Xaa3–6 – Cys5 – Thr – Xaa3 – Cys6). Detailed analysis of the 3-D structure shows that these six residues form three disulfide bridges (Cys1–4, Cys2–6, Cys3–5), giving members of the pacifastin family a typical fold and remarkable stability.

Pacifastin is a 155kDa protein composed of two covalently linked subunits, which are separately encoded. The heavy chain of pacifastin (105 kDa) is related to transferrins as it carries three transferrin lobes, two of which seem to be active in iron binding. A number of the transferrin family members are also serine peptidases, and belong to MEROPS peptidase family S60 (INTERPRO). The light chain of pacifastin (44 kDa) is the proteinase inhibitory subunit, and consists of up to nine cysteine-rich inhibitory domains that are homologous to each other. The locust inhibitors share a conserved array of six residues with the pacifastin light chain. The structure of members of this family reveals that they consist of a triple-stranded antiparallel beta-sheet connected by three disulphide bridges.

This family of serine protease inhibitors belongs to MEROPS inhibitor family I19, clan IW. They inhibit chymotrypsin, a peptidase belong to the S1 family (INTERPRO).
