= Tissue factor pathway inhibitor =

Single-chain polypeptide capable of inhibiting blood clotting Factor Xa

TFPI
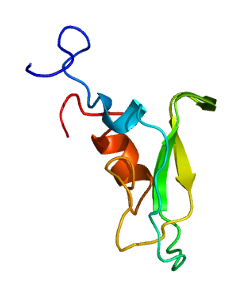

Identifiers
- Aliases: TFPI, EPI, LACI, TFI, TFPI1, tissue factor pathway inhibitor
- External IDs: OMIM: 152310; MGI: 1095418; GeneCards: TFPI
Available structures
PDB	Ortholog search: PDBe RCSB
PDB	List of PDB id codes 4DTG, 1ADZ, 1IRH, 1TFX, 4BQD

Gene location (Human)
Chr.	Chromosome 2 (human)
Band	2q32.1	Start	187,464,230 bp
Band	2q32.1	End	187,565,760 bp

Gene location (Mouse)
Chr.	Chromosome 2 (mouse)
Band	2|2 D	Start	84,263,199 bp
Band	2|2 D	End	84,307,119 bp
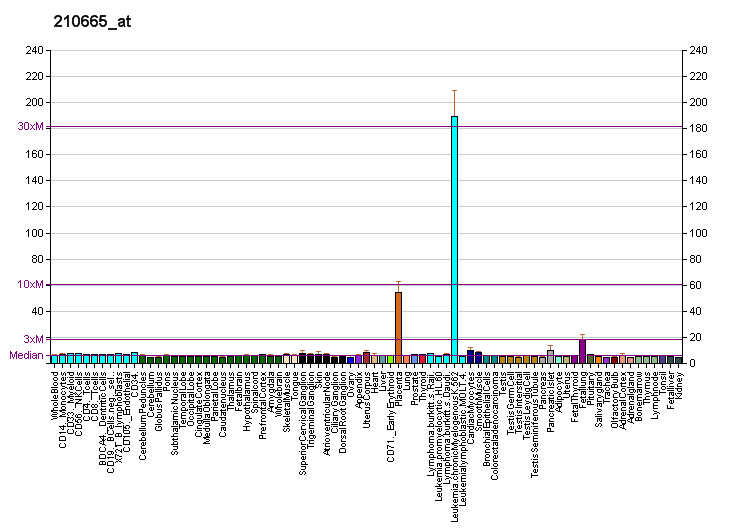

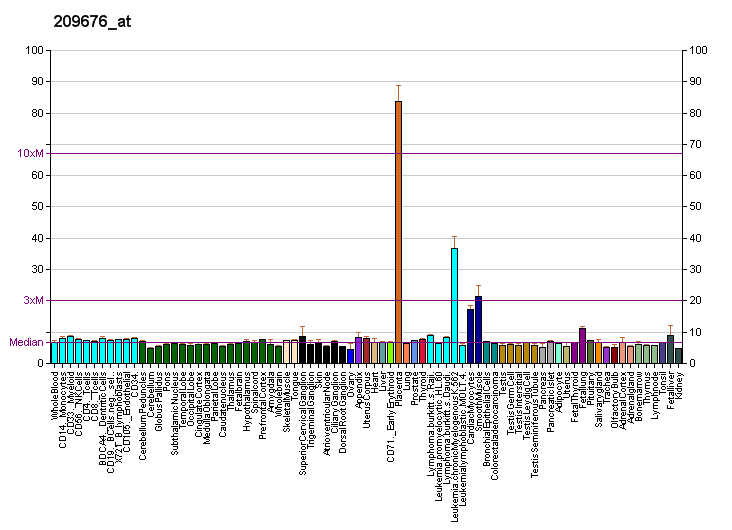

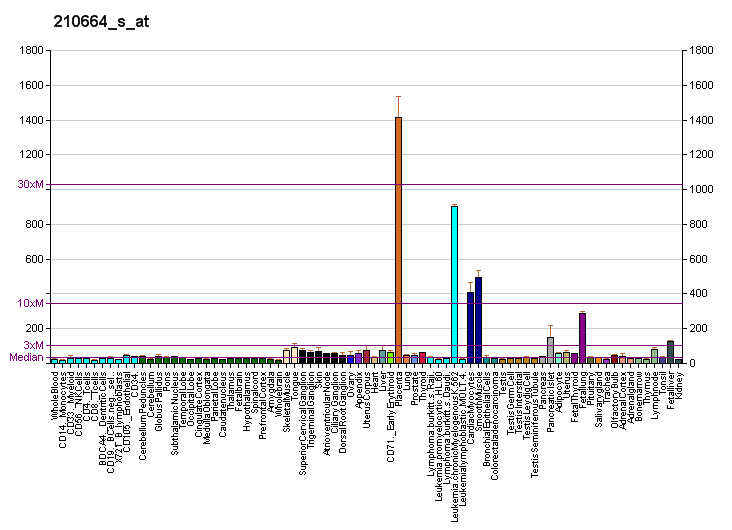
RNA expression pattern
Bgee	Human / Mouse (ortholog); Top expressed in: right lung; lower lobe of lung; visceral pleura; upper lobe of lung; placenta; upper lobe of left lung; stromal cell of endometrium; liver; pericardium; right lobe of liver / Top expressed in: gastrula; placenta; decidua; atrioventricular valve; vas deferens; dermis; endocardial cushion; endothelial cell of lymphatic vessel; efferent ductule; umbilical cord; More reference expression data
BioGPS	More reference expression data
Gene ontology
Molecular function	peptidase inhibitor activity; endopeptidase inhibitor activity; serine-type endopeptidase inhibitor activity
Cellular component	organelle membrane; extracellular region; cell surface; anchored component of membrane; plasma membrane; endoplasmic reticulum; membrane; intracellular membrane-bounded organelle; extracellular space; caveola
Biological process	hemostasis; blood coagulation, extrinsic pathway; negative regulation of peptidase activity; blood coagulation; response to lipopolysaccharide; response to estradiol; cellular response to lipopolysaccharide; negative regulation of endopeptidase activity; cellular response to interleukin-1; negative regulation of blood coagulation; cellular response to steroid hormone stimulus
Sources:Amigo / QuickGO
Orthologs
Databases	NCBI: entry; OMA: entry
Species	Human	Mouse
Entrez	7035	21788
Ensembl	ENSG00000003436	ENSMUSG00000027082
UniProt	P10646	O54819
RefSeq (mRNA)	NM_001032281; NM_006287; NM_001318941; NM_001329239; NM_001329240 NM_001329241	NM_001177319; NM_001177320; NM_011576; NM_001355271; NM_001355273
RefSeq (protein)	NP_001027452; NP_001305870; NP_001316168; NP_001316169; NP_001316170 NP_006278	NP_001170790; NP_001170791; NP_035706; NP_001342200; NP_001342202
Location (UCSC)	Chr 2: 187.46 – 187.57 Mb	Chr 2: 84.26 – 84.31 Mb
PubMed search
- Wikidata
View/Edit Human	View/Edit Mouse

Tissue factor pathway inhibitor (or TFPI) is a single-chain polypeptide which can reversibly inhibit factor Xa (Xa). While Xa is inhibited, the Xa-TFPI complex can subsequently also inhibit the FVIIa-tissue factor complex. TFPI contributes significantly to the inhibition of Xa in vivo, despite being present at concentrations of only 2.5 nM.

== Genetics ==
The gene for TFPI is located on chromosome 2q31-q32.1, and has nine exons which span 70 kb. A similar gene, termed TFPI2, has been identified on chromosome 7, at locus 7q21.3; in addition to TFPI activity, its product also has retinal pigment epithelial cell growth-promoting properties.

== Protein structure ==
TFPI has a relative molecular mass of 34,000 to 40,000 depending on the degree of proteolysis of the C-terminal region.

TFPI consists of a highly negatively charged amino-terminus, three tandemly linked Kunitz domains, and a highly positively charged carboxy-terminus. With its Kunitz domains, TFPI exhibits significant homology with human inter-alpha-trypsin inhibitor and bovine basic pancreatic trypsin inhibitor.

== Interactions ==
Tissue factor pathway inhibitor has been shown to interact with Factor X.

== See also ==
- Hemostasis
