= Yehudith Birk =

Polish-born Israeli biochemist

Yehudith Birk (Hebrew: יהודית בירק; 30 September 1926 – 14 January 2013) was a Polish-born Israeli biochemist, awarded the 1998 Israel Prize for agricultural research.

== Biography ==
Yehudith Gershtanski (later Birk) was born in Grajewo, Poland to Frida (née Borowitz; 1895–1974) and Yitzhak Gershtanski (1890–1950), both ardent Zionist activists. Frida was an accountant and Baruch was a businessman. The family immigrated to the British Mandate for Palestine in 1935, settling in Tel Aviv. Gershtanski attended the school for workers’ children on Lasalle Street in Tel Aviv. She studied for a master's degree in biochemistry and microbiology at Hebrew University of Jerusalem, completing her degree in December 1950. She received a doctorate in biochemistry from Hebrew University's Faculty of Agriculture in Rehovot in 1954.

From 1948–49, she served in the Israel Defense Forces' science corps, achieving the rank of second lieutenant in a scientific research unit which was developing and testing parachute flares which would be dropped from planes to illuminate enemy territory.

Around 1948, at the onset of the 1947–1949 Palestine war, Gershtanski married a physicist with the Weizmann Institute, Meir Birk (born 1924 – died 2000), whom she had first met in 1937, when she was eleven years old, as he was the son of her parents' landlords on Balfour Street, Tel Aviv. They had two sons: Yitzhak (born 1953) and Ohad-Shmuel (born 1957).

== Academic career ==
In 1956, she began teaching at the Faculty of Agriculture, attaining full professorship in 1970. She founded the Food Science and Nutrition school at the Hebrew University Institute of Biochemistry, and was its founding director from 1972–74. She was dean of the Faulty of Agriculture from 1977–80.

Her best-known achievement was isolating and investigating a protease inhibitor predominant in legume seeds, known today as the Bowman–Birk protease inhibitor. She also helped discover the ß-lipotropin (lipolytic hormone). Her book, Plant Protease Inhibitors: Significance in Nutrition, Plant Protection, Cancer Prevention and Genetic Engineering, was published in 2003.

== Awards and recognition ==
In 1978, Birk received the Rothschild Prize and the Mo'ezet Irgunei Nashim be-Yisrael Medal for her accomplishments in research and teaching. From 1990–95, she served as Pro-Rector of the Hebrew University. A member of the Israel Academy of Science and Humanities since 1993, Birk was elected as an active member of the European Academy of Sciences and Arts in 2004.

== See also ==
- Bowman–Birk protease inhibitor
- Agricultural research in Israel
