= Kunitz domain =

InterPro Domain

Kunitz/Bovine pancreatic trypsin inhibitor domain
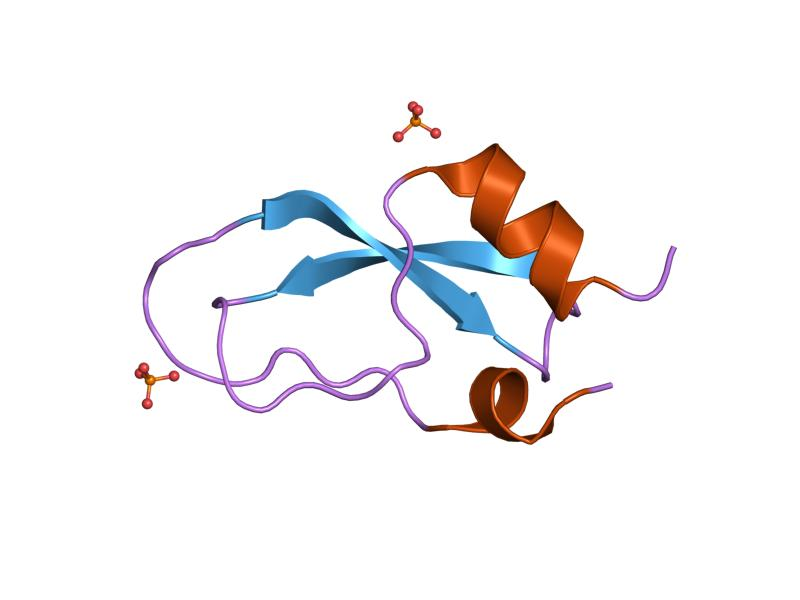
- 3D structure of the C-terminal Kunitz domain from human collagen alpha-3(VI) chain.

Identifiers
- Symbol: Kunitz_BPTI
- Pfam: PF00014
- InterPro: IPR002223
- PROSITE: PDOC00252
- SCOP2: 5pti / SCOPe / SUPFAM
- CDD: cd00109
Available protein structures:
- PDB: 1knt :3110-3162 2knt :3110-3162 1kthA:3110-3162 1kun :3110-3162 1bik :286-338 1shp :2-54 1jc6A:6-58 1bf0 :6-58 1dtk :26-78 1dtx :6-58 1den :6-58 1dem :6-58 1zr0D:35-87 1irhA:216-268 1adz :124-176 1tfxC:124-176 1d0dB:39-91 1k6uA:39-91 2fi4I:39-91 1aalA:39-91 2kaiI:39-91 1ejmD:39-91 1fakI:39-90 1bhcG:39-91 2hexC:39-91 1bthQ:39-91 3btwI:39-91 1p2qB:39-91 1bz5C:39-91 3bthI:39-91 1oa65:39-91 1eawB:39-91 3btmI:39-91 1oa55:39-91 2tpiI:39-91 1pit :39-91 3btdI:39-91 1b0cD:39-91 3btfI:39-91 1t8mB:39-91 1ld5A:39-91 1bzxI:39-91 1p2jI:39-91 1uubA:39-91 3tgkI:39-91 1t7cD:39-91 1tpaI:39-91 1p2nB:39-91 1p2kI:39-91 1t8nB:39-91 1g6xA:39-91 1nag :39-91 8pti :39-91 2fi3I:39-91 1t8oB:39-91 1k09B:50-73 1p2mB:39-91 6pti :39-91 3tpiI:39-91 1t8lD:39-91 3btgI:39-91 3tgjI:39-91 1brbI:42-90 1jv9A:39-91 1f7zI:39-91 1fy8I:39-91 2ptcI:39-91 2tgpI:39-91 1mtnD:39-91 1cbwI:39-91 1jv8A:39-91 1f5rI:39-91 7pti :39-91 3bteI:39-91 1fan :39-91 3tgiI:39-91 3btkI:39-91 5pti :39-91 1uuaA:39-91 9pti :39-91 3bttI:39-91 1bpi :39-91 1p2oD:39-91 1bpt :39-91 1p2iI:39-91 4pti :39-91 1qlqA:39-91 1ld6A:39-91 3btqI:39-91 4tpiI:39-91 1bti :39-91 1yc0I:249-301 1ca0I:290-342 1aapB:290-342 1tawB:290-342 1brcI:290-342 1zjdB:290-342 1bunB:30-82 1tocR:4-51 1kigI:4-60 1tap :4-60 1tcp :4-60 IPR002223 PF00014 (ECOD; PDBsum)
- AlphaFold: IPR002223; PF00014

Kunitz domains are the active domains of proteins that inhibit the function of protein degrading enzymes or, more specifically, domains of Kunitz-type are protease inhibitors. They are relatively small with a length of about 50 to 60 amino acids and a molecular weight of 6 kDa. Examples of Kunitz-type protease inhibitors are aprotinin (bovine pancreatic trypsin inhibitor, BPTI), Alzheimer's amyloid precursor protein (APP), and tissue factor pathway inhibitor (TFPI). Kunitz STI protease inhibitor, the trypsin inhibitor initially studied by Moses Kunitz, was extracted from soybeans.

Standalone Kunitz domains are used as a framework for the development of new pharmaceutical drugs.

== Structure ==
The structure is a disulfide rich alpha+beta fold. Bovine pancreatic trypsin inhibitor is an extensively studied model structure. Certain family members are similar to the tick anticoagulant peptide (TAP, P17726). This is a highly selective inhibitor of factor Xa in the blood coagulation pathways. TAP molecules are highly dipolar, and are arranged to form a twisted two-stranded antiparallel beta sheet followed by an alpha helix.

The majority of the sequences having this domain belong to the MEROPS inhibitor family I2, clan IB; the Kunitz/bovine pancreatic trypsin inhibitor family, they inhibit proteases of the S1 family and are restricted to the metazoa with a single exception: Amsacta moorei entomopoxvirus, a species of poxvirus. They are short (about 50 to 60 amino acid residues) alpha/beta proteins with few secondary structures. The fold is constrained by three disulfide bonds. The type example for this family is BPTI (or basic protease inhibitor), but the family includes numerous other members, such as snake venom basic protease; mammalian inter-alpha-trypsin inhibitors; trypstatin, a rat mast cell inhibitor of trypsin; a domain found in an alternatively spliced form of Alzheimer's amyloid beta-protein; domains at the C-termini of the alpha-1 and alpha-3 chains of type VI and type VII collagens; tissue factor pathway inhibitor precursor; and Kunitz STI protease inhibitor contained in legume seeds.

== Drug development ==
Kunitz domains are stable as standalone peptides, able to recognise specific protein structures, and also work as competitive protease inhibitors in their free form. These properties have led to attempts at developing biopharmaceutical drugs from Kunitz domains. Candidate domains are selected from molecular libraries containing over 10 million variants with the aid of display techniques like phage display, and can be produced in large scale by genetically engineered organisms.

The first of these drugs to be marketed was the kallikrein inhibitor ecallantide, used for the treatment of hereditary angioedema. It was approved in the United States in 2009. Another example is depelestat, an inhibitor of neutrophil elastase that has undergone Phase II clinical trials for the treatment of acute respiratory distress syndrome in 2006/2007 and has also been described as a potential inhalable cystic fibrosis treatment.

== Examples ==
Human proteins containing this domain include:

- AMBP, APLP2, APP
- COL6A3, COL7A1, COL28A1
- PAPLN,
- EPPIN, SPINT1, SPINT2, SPINT3, SPINT4
- TFPI, TFPI2
- WFDC6, WFDC8, WFIKKN1, WFIKKN2

Several plant protease inhibitors of the Kunitz family, the Kunitz-STI protein family, include a beta trefoil fold.
