= SPINT2 =

Protein-coding gene in the species Homo sapiens

Identifiers
- Aliases: SPINT2, DIAR3, HAI-2, HAI2, Kop, PB, serine peptidase inhibitor, Kunitz type, 2, serine peptidase inhibitor, Kunitz type 2
- External IDs: OMIM: 605124; MGI: 1338031; GeneCards: SPINT2
Available structures
PDB	Ortholog search: PDBe RCSB
PDB	List of PDB id codes 4U32

Gene location (Human)
Chr.	Chromosome 19 (human)
Band	19q13.2	Start	38,244,035 bp
Band	19q13.2	End	38,292,615 bp

Gene location (Mouse)
Chr.	Chromosome 7 (mouse)
Band	7|7 B1	Start	28,955,748 bp
Band	7|7 B1	End	28,981,337 bp
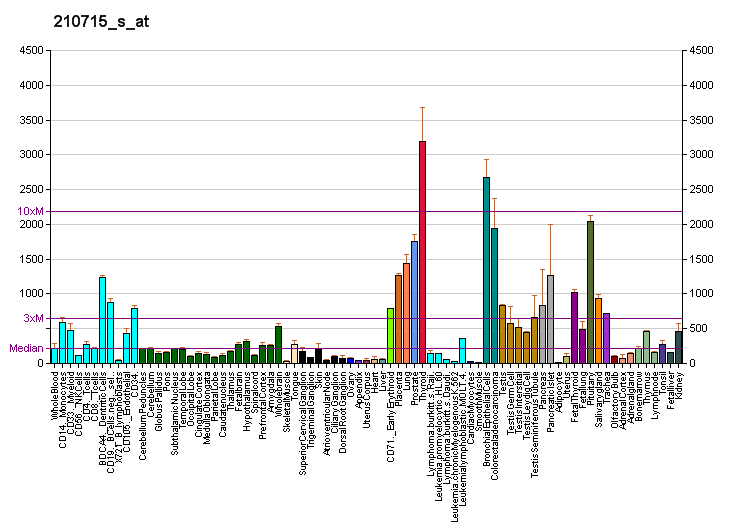
RNA expression pattern
Bgee	Human / Mouse (ortholog); Top expressed in: beta cell; mucosa of transverse colon; parotid gland; pituitary gland; anterior pituitary; olfactory zone of nasal mucosa; left lobe of thyroid gland; right lobe of thyroid gland; right uterine tube; right testis / Top expressed in: left colon; submandibular gland; intestinal villus; crypt of lieberkuhn of small intestine; pyloric antrum; duodenum; parotid gland; ileum; right kidney; epithelium of small intestine; More reference expression data
BioGPS	More reference expression data
Gene ontology
Molecular function	peptidase inhibitor activity; endopeptidase inhibitor activity; serine-type endopeptidase inhibitor activity; protein binding
Cellular component	cytoplasm; integral component of membrane; extracellular region; membrane; plasma membrane
Biological process	negative regulation of cell motility; negative regulation of peptidase activity; negative regulation of cell-cell adhesion; establishment or maintenance of cell polarity; negative regulation of neural precursor cell proliferation; neural tube closure; negative regulation of endopeptidase activity; epithelial cell morphogenesis involved in placental branching; cellular response to BMP stimulus; basement membrane organization
Sources:Amigo / QuickGO
Orthologs
Databases	NCBI: entry; OMA: entry
Species	Human	Mouse
Entrez	10653	20733
Ensembl	ENSG00000167642	ENSMUSG00000074227
UniProt	O43291	Q9WU03
RefSeq (mRNA)	NM_021102; NM_001166103	NM_001082548; NM_011464
RefSeq (protein)	NP_001159575; NP_066925	NP_001076017; NP_035594
Location (UCSC)	Chr 19: 38.24 – 38.29 Mb	Chr 7: 28.96 – 28.98 Mb
PubMed search
- Wikidata
View/Edit Human	View/Edit Mouse

Kunitz-type protease inhibitor 2 is an enzyme inhibitor that in humans is encoded by the SPINT2 gene. SPINT2 is a transmembrane protein with two extracellular Kunitz domains to inhibit serine proteases. This gene is a presumed tumor suppressor by inhibiting HGF activator which prevents the formation of active hepatocyte growth factor. Mutations in SPINT2 could result in congenital sodium diarrhea (CSD).
