= Beta trefoil fold =

Protein fold

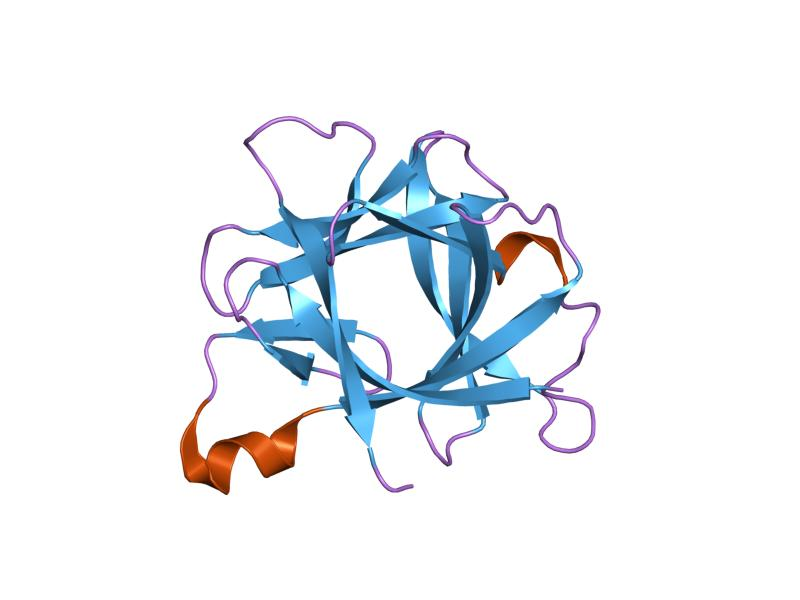
Structure of the beta trefoil fold of Interleukin 1b.

In molecular biology the β trefoil fold is a protein fold that consists of six beta hairpins, each formed by two beta strands. Together these form a beta barrel with a triangular "cap", each consisting of three hairpins. Overall, this structure has an approximate three-fold symmetry.

== Details ==
The hairpins are arranged in three β-β-β-loop-β sequences, each having a "Y" or trefoil-like structure. The first and fourth β strands form one hairpin, while the second and third form the other hairpin- each hairpin forms another arm of the "Y" and the long loop forms its trunk.

The beta barrel has a 16 Å diameter, and is filled with amino acid side-chains.

== Occurrence ==
Among other proteins, β trefoil fold is found in Kunitz inhibitors of several plants such as soybean, Erythrina afra and wheat; in members of the interleukin 1 cytokine family (interleukin-1 alpha, interleukin-1 beta and interleukin-1 receptor antagonist); and in fibroblast growth factors 1 and 2.
