= Trypsin inhibitor =

Serine proteinase inhibitors which inhibit trypsin

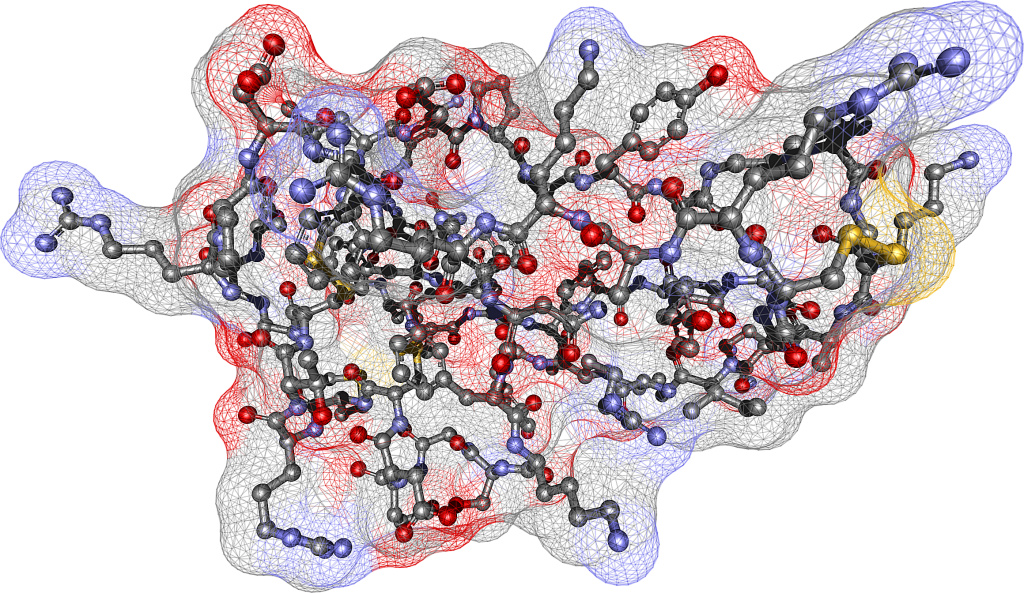
a wireframe representation of TI

A trypsin inhibitor (TI) is a protein and a type of serine protease inhibitor (serpin) that reduces the biological activity of trypsin by controlling the activation and catalytic reactions of proteins. Trypsin is an enzyme involved in the breakdown of many different proteins, primarily as part of digestion in humans and other animals such as monogastrics and young ruminants. Serpins – including trypsin inhibitors – are irreversible and suicide substrate-like inhibitors.

It destructively alters trypsin thereby rendering it unavailable to bind with proteins for the digestion process. As a result, protease inhibitors that interfere with digestion activity have an antinutritional effect. Therefore, trypsin inhibitors are considered an anti-nutritional factor or ANF. Additionally, trypsin inhibitor partially interferes with chymotrypsin function.

Trypsinogen is an inactive form of trypsin, its inactive form ensures protein aspects of the body, such as the pancreas and muscles, are not broken down. It is formed in the pancreas and activated to trypsin with enteropeptidase Chymotrypsinogen is the inactive form of chymotrypsin and has similar functions as trypsin.

The presence of trypsin inhibitor has been found to result in delayed growth as well as metabolic and digestive diseases. Additionally, pancreatic hypertrophy is a common occurrence with trypsin inhibitor consumption The presence of trypsin inhibitor in a product reduces the protein efficiency and therefore results in the consumers body not being able to efficiently and fully utilize the protein.

== Function ==
Trypsin inhibitor is present in various foods such as soybeans, grains, cereals and various additional legumes. The main function of trypsin inhibitors in these foods is to act as a defense mechanism. By having this harmful component wild animals learn that any food that contains trypsin inhibitor is a food to avoid. Trypsin inhibitor can also be essential for biological processes within the plant.

Trypsin inhibitor can also naturally occur in the pancreas of species such as bovines. The function of this is to protect the animal from any accidental activation of trypsinogen and/or chymotrypsinogen

== Inactivation ==
Trypsin inhibitor is heat labile, therefore by exposing these foods to heat, the trypsin inhibitor is removed and the food subsequently becomes safe to eat. Boiling soybeans for 14 minutes inactivates about 80% of the inhibitor, and for 30 minutes, about 90%. At higher temperatures, e.g., in pressure cookers, shorter cooking times are needed. ELISA tests can be used to measure the degree of deactivation achieved.

== Applications in commercial industries ==
The most prominent application of trypsin inhibitor is livestock feed. Soybeans are a popular ingredient in livestock feed therefore trypsin inhibitor can be a concern due to the presence of it in soybeans. The majority of soybeans used in livestock feed is converted to soybean meal and through the process the trypsin inhibitor is removed due to the heat treatment. However, experiments have been done concerning animals who consume active trypsin inhibitor and they consistently have decreased weights.

Major commercial sources
Source	Inhibitor	Molecular weight	Inhibitory power	Details
Blood plasma	α_{1}-antitrypsin	52 kDa		Also known as serum trypsin inhibitor
Lima beans		8–10 kDa	2.2 times weight	A mixture of six different inhibitors
Bovine pancreas and lung	Aprotinin	6.5 kDa	2.5 times weight	Also known as BPTI (basic pancreatic trypsin inhibitor) and Kunitz inhibitor. Best-known pancreatic inhibitor. Inhibits several different serine proteases
Raw avian egg white	Ovomucin	8–10 kDa	1.2 times weight	The ovomucoids are a mixture of several different glycoprotein protease inhibitors
Soybeans		20.7–22.3 kDa	1.2 times weight	A mixture of several different inhibitors. All also bind chymotrypsin to a lesser degree.

A study revealing that a protease inhibitor from the eggs of the freshwater snail Pomacea canaliculata, interacting as a trypsin inhibitor with the protease of potential predators, was reported in 2010, the first direct evidence for this mechanism in the animal kingdom.

== Clinical significance ==
The peptide tumor-associated trypsin inhibitor (TATI) has been used as a marker of mucinous ovarian carcinoma, urothelial carcinoma, and renal cell carcinoma. TATI is metabolised by the kidneys and is, thus, elevated in patients with kidney failure. It may be elevated in non-neoplastic processes such as pancreatitis and can be used as a prognostic marker in this setting (levels above 70 micrograms/L are associated with poor prognosis).

Fifty percent of stage I mucinous ovarian carcinomas are associated with elevated TATI, and nearly 100% of stage IV tumors show elevated TATI.

Eighty-five to 95% of pancreatic adenocarcinomas are associated with increased TATI (but elevation in pancreatitis limits the clinical utility of TATI in this setting; see above).

Sixty percent of gastric adenocarcinomas show elevated TATI, in particular tumors of diffusely infiltrative/signet ring type. TATI, thus, complements CEA, which is elevated exclusively in intestinal type adenocarcinoma of the stomach.

In urothelial carcinoma, TATI expression varies with stage, ranging from 20% in low-stage tumors to 80% of high-stage tumors.

TATI sensitivity in the setting of renal cell carcinoma is approximately 70%. Elevated TATI is more likely to be seen in patients with advanced-stage disease.

In nearly all tumor types studied, TATI is a marker of poor prognosis.
