= Proteinase inhibitors in plants =

In plant biology, proteinase inhibitors are a family of small proteins that serve an integral role in the plant's defense mechanisms against herbivory from insects or microorganisms that may compromise the integrity of the plant.

== Functionality ==
The proteinase inhibitors work to disrupt the enzymatic ability of the digestive or microbial enzymes that are present in the stomach of the attacker resulting in the inability to properly digest the plant material. This causes an interference of proper growth and discourages further wounding of the plant by the attacker. Studies have also recently revealed that some proteinase inhibitors also provide defense for the plant through the possession of antimicrobial properties providing for the inhibition of pathogen growth.

== Wounding ==
While proteinase inhibitors are present in plants naturally, production of these proteins for defense is often induced by either wounding of the plant or by chemical signaling through molecules such as methyl jasmonate. Both wounding of the plant as well as signaling molecules result in the formation of jasmonic acid, which then induces the gene expression of proteinase inhibitors. Many other signal cascades as well as the translocation of signal molecules through the phloem and xylem of the plant are also necessary for the production of these inhibitors.

Once the proteinase inhibitor has been ingested by the insect, it presents itself as a normal substrate for the digestive enzymes binding to the active site on the enzyme. This binding of the inhibitor to the proteinase creates a new complex that is very unlikely to dissociate. Once bound, the active site can no longer be accessed by any other substrate and the enzyme can no longer digest the amino acids of the plant. Without proper digestion, the insect is unable to grow, and may starve if it chooses to remain at the wounded plant. Similar inhibition of growth can be seen in pathogens that interact with these inhibitors.

== Tomato experiment ==
In order to discover how the production of the inhibitors was induced, scientists exposed tomato plants to different forms of methyl jasmonate and then assayed using radial immunodiffusion for proteinase inhibitors in leaf juices. A group of tomato plants was sprayed with a solution containing methyl jasmonate, while another group of tomato plants was exposed to methyl jasmonate vapor in air-tight glass chambers. Control groups were sprayed with a solution or exposed to a vapor that did not contain methyl jasmonate. Both experimental groups revealed increased proteinase inhibitor production as a result of exposure to volatile methyl jasmonate in comparison to control groups.

== Defense behavior ==
The production of proteinase inhibitors reveals that plants have the ability to alter their defense behavior in response to a threat or direct attack on plant integrity. This complex defense mechanism serves to not only protect the plant from being eaten, but also from pathogen infection requiring both coordination and communication.
