= Inhibitor protein =

Cell biology

The inhibitor protein (IP) is situated in the mitochondrial matrix and protects the cell against rapid ATP hydrolysis during momentary ischaemia. In oxygen absence, the pH of the matrix drops. This causes IP to become protonated and change its conformation to one that can bind to the F1Fo synthetase and stops it thereby preventing it from moving in a backwards direction and hydrolyze ATP instead of make it. When oxygen is finally incorporated into the system, the pH rises and IP is deprotonated. IP dissociates from the F1Fo synthetase and allows it to resume its ATP synthesis.
