= Kunitz STI protease inhibitor =

Trypsin and protease inhibitor
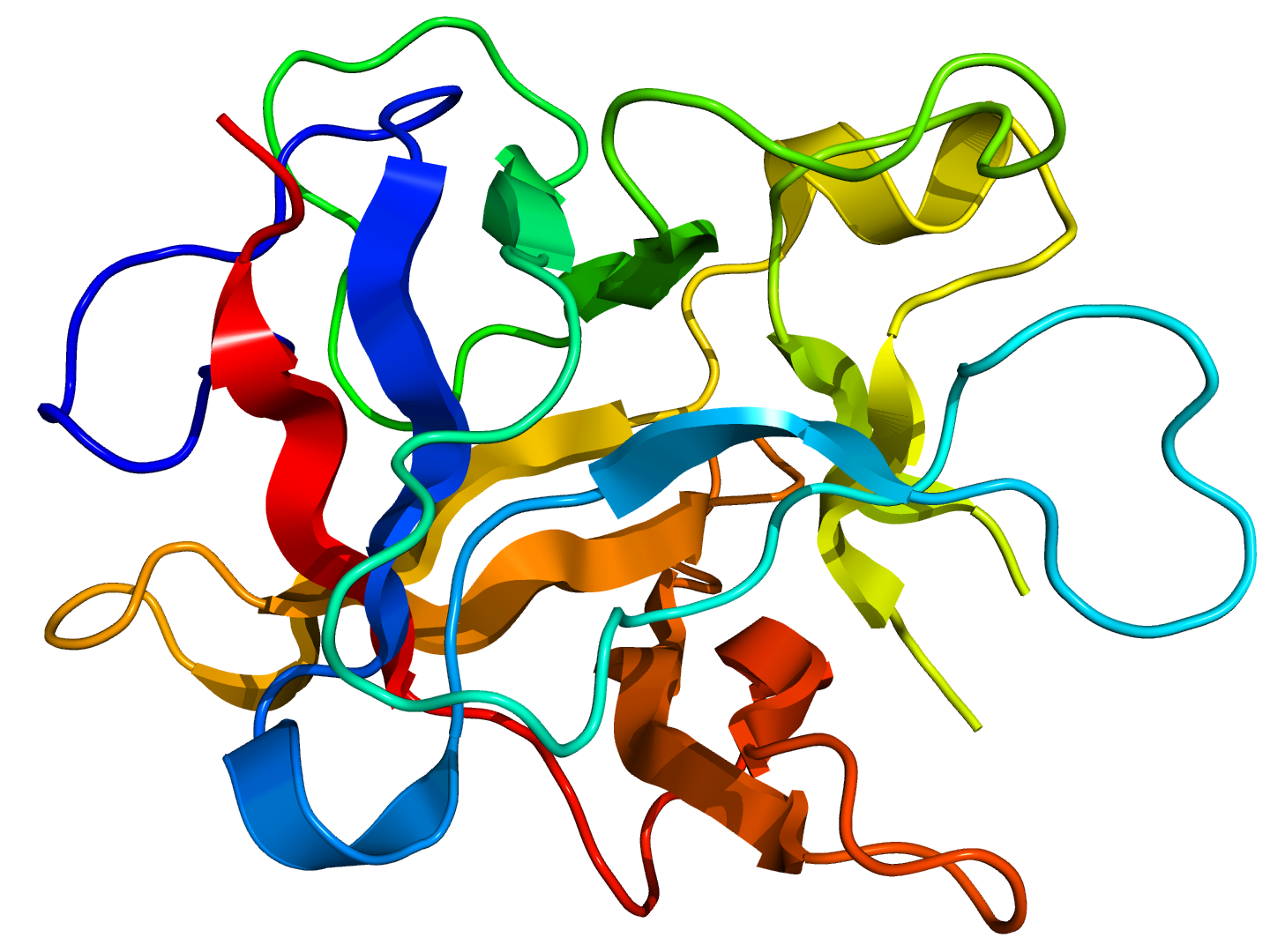
- Structure of a Kunitz-type trypsin inhibitor.

Identifiers
- Symbol: Kunitz_legume
- Pfam: PF00197
- InterPro: IPR002160
- PROSITE: PDOC00255
- SCOP2: 1tie / SCOPe / SUPFAM
Available protein structures:
- PDB: 1ava, 1avu, 1ba7 , 1eyl, 1fmz, 1fn0, 1r8n, 1tie, 1wba, 1wbc, 1xg6, 2bea, 2beb, 2esu, 2et2, 2iwt, 2wbc, 4wbc IPR002160 PF00197 (ECOD; PDBsum)
- AlphaFold: IPR002160; PF00197

Kunitz soybean trypsin inhibitor is a type of protein contained in legume seeds which functions as a protease inhibitor. Kunitz-type soybean trypsin inhibitors are usually specific for either trypsin or chymotrypsin. They are thought to protect seeds against consumption by animal predators.

== Background ==
Two types of trypsin inhibitors are found in soy: the Kunitz-type soybean trypsin inhibitor (STI, discovered by Moses Kunitz and sometimes abbreviated as KTI) and the Bowman-Birk inhibitor (BBI). STI is a large (20,100 daltons), strong inhibitor of trypsin, while BBI is much smaller (8,000 daltons) and inhibits both trypsin and chymotrypsin. Both inhibitors have significant anti-nutritive effects in the body, affecting digestion by hindering protein hydrolysis and activation of other enzymes in the gut. STI is found in much larger concentrations than BBI in soy, however, to achieve the highest nutritional value from soy, both of these inhibitors must be denatured in some way. STI (KTI) is commonly denatured by thermal processing, while BBI is most effectively denatured by reducing agents or enzymatic treatment. Whole soybeans have been reported to contain 17–27 mg of trypsin inhibitor per gram.

Protease inhibitory activity is decreased by cooking soybeans, leading to low levels in soy products such as tofu and soy milk.

== Structure ==
Proteins from the Kunitz family contain from 170 to 200 amino acid residues and one or two intra-chain disulfide bonds. The best conserved region is found in their N-terminal section. The crystal structures of soybean trypsin inhibitor (STI), trypsin inhibitor DE-3 from the coral tree Erythrina afra (ETI) and the bifunctional proteinase K/alpha-amylase inhibitor from wheat (PK13) have been solved, showing them to share the same beta trefoil fold structure as those of interleukin 1 and heparin-binding growth factors.

Despite the structural similarity, STI shows no interleukin-1 bioactivity, presumably as a result of their primary sequence disparities. The active inhibitory site containing the scissile bond is located in the loop between beta-strands 4 and 5 in STI and ETI.

== Action and consequences of trypsin inhibitors ==
Trypsin inhibitors require a specific three-dimensional structure in order to inactivate trypsin in the body. They bind strongly to trypsin, blocking its active site and instantly forming a highly stable adduct and halting digestion of certain proteins. Trypsin, a serine protease, is responsible for cleaving the polypeptide backbone following arginine or lysine.

After a meal, trypsinogen release is stimulated by cholecystokinin and undergoes specific proteolysis for activation. Free trypsin is then able to activate other serine proteases, such as chymotrypsin, elastase, and more trypsin (by autocatalysis), or continue breaking down proteins. However, if trypsin inhibitors (specifically STI) are present, the majority of trypsin in the cycle of digestion is inactivated and ingested proteins remain whole. Effects of this occurrence include gastric distress, and pancreatic hyperplasia (proliferation of cells) or hypertrophy (enlargement of cells).

The amount of soy inhibitors is directly related to the amount of trypsin it will inhibit, therefore a product with high concentration of soy is likely to produce large values of inhibition. In a rat model, animals were fed either soy protein concentrate or direct concentrate of STI. In both instances, after a week the rats showed a dose-related increase in pancreas weight due to both hyperplasia and hypertrophy. This indicates that long-term consumption of a diet high in soy with strong trypsin inhibitor activity may produce unwanted effects in humans as well.

== Inactivation of Trypsin Inhibitors ==
A significant amount of research is being done to determine the best method of inhibitor inactivation. The most successful methods found so far include:

- Heat
- Freezing
- Addition of Sulfites

== Gastrobodies ==
STI is highly resistant to pepsin, enabling STI to avoid degradation in the stomach and then inhibit trypsin. Hence STI was engineered into an antibody mimetic called a gastrobody, aiming to address the problems of antibody degradation in the gut following oral delivery. Loops of STI were randomized and selected by phage display for binding to a target of interest (a toxin from Clostridioides difficile).

== Cancer Research ==
While trypsin inhibitors have been widely regarded as anti-nutritive factors in soy, research is currently being done on the inhibitors’ possible anti-carcinogenic characteristics. Some research has shown that protease inhibitors can cause irreversible suppressive effect on carcinogenic cell growth. However, the mechanism is still unknown. The cancers showing positive results for this new development are colon, oral, lung, liver, and esophageal cancers. Further research is still necessary to determine things such as the method of delivery for this natural anti-carcinogen, as well as performing extensive clinical trials in this area.
