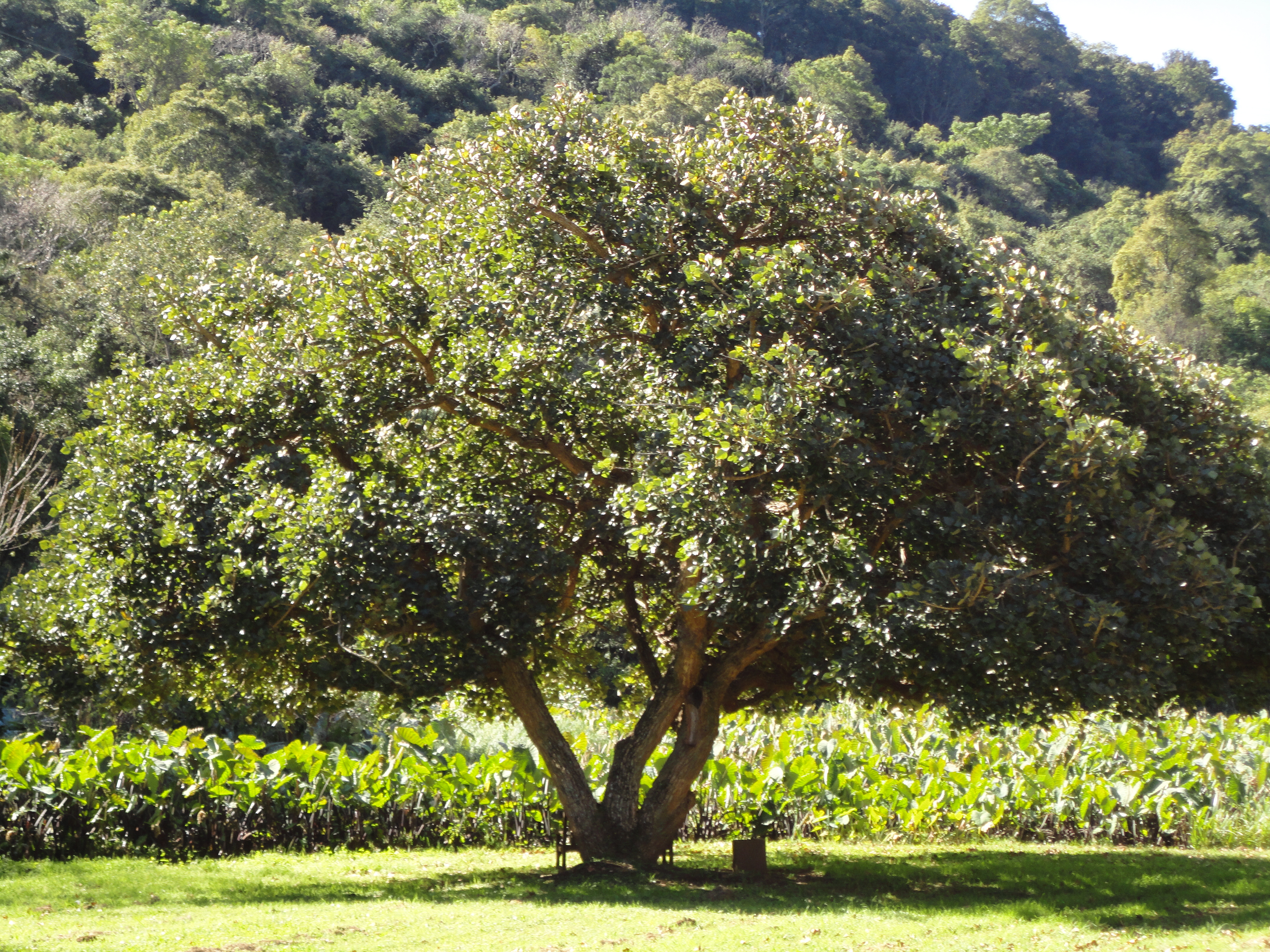
- Growth habit of a mature tree

Conservation status
- Least Concern (IUCN 3.1)

Scientific classification
- Kingdom: Plantae
- Clade: Embryophytes
- Clade: Tracheophytes
- Clade: Spermatophytes
- Clade: Angiosperms
- Clade: Eudicots
- Clade: Rosids
- Order: Fabales
- Family: Fabaceae
- Subfamily: Faboideae
- Genus: Erythrina
- Species: E. afra

Binomial name
- Erythrina afra Thunb.
- Erythrina afra distribution Extant (resident)

Synonyms
- Erythrina fissa C.Presl; Duchassaingia afra (Thunb.) Walp.; Chirocalyx pubescens Walp.; Erythrina insignis Tod.; Erythrina viarum Tod.; Corallodendron afrum (Thunb.) Kuntze; Erythrina constantiana Micheli; Erythrina caffra Thumb. (emended)

= Erythrina afra =

Species of legume

Erythrina afra, the coast coral tree or African coral tree (historically also the kaffir tree), is a tree native to southeastern Africa, which is often cultivated and has introduced populations in California and India. All the 17 species of coral tree in the genus Erythrina are collectively considered the official tree of Los Angeles, California in the United States.

== Description ==
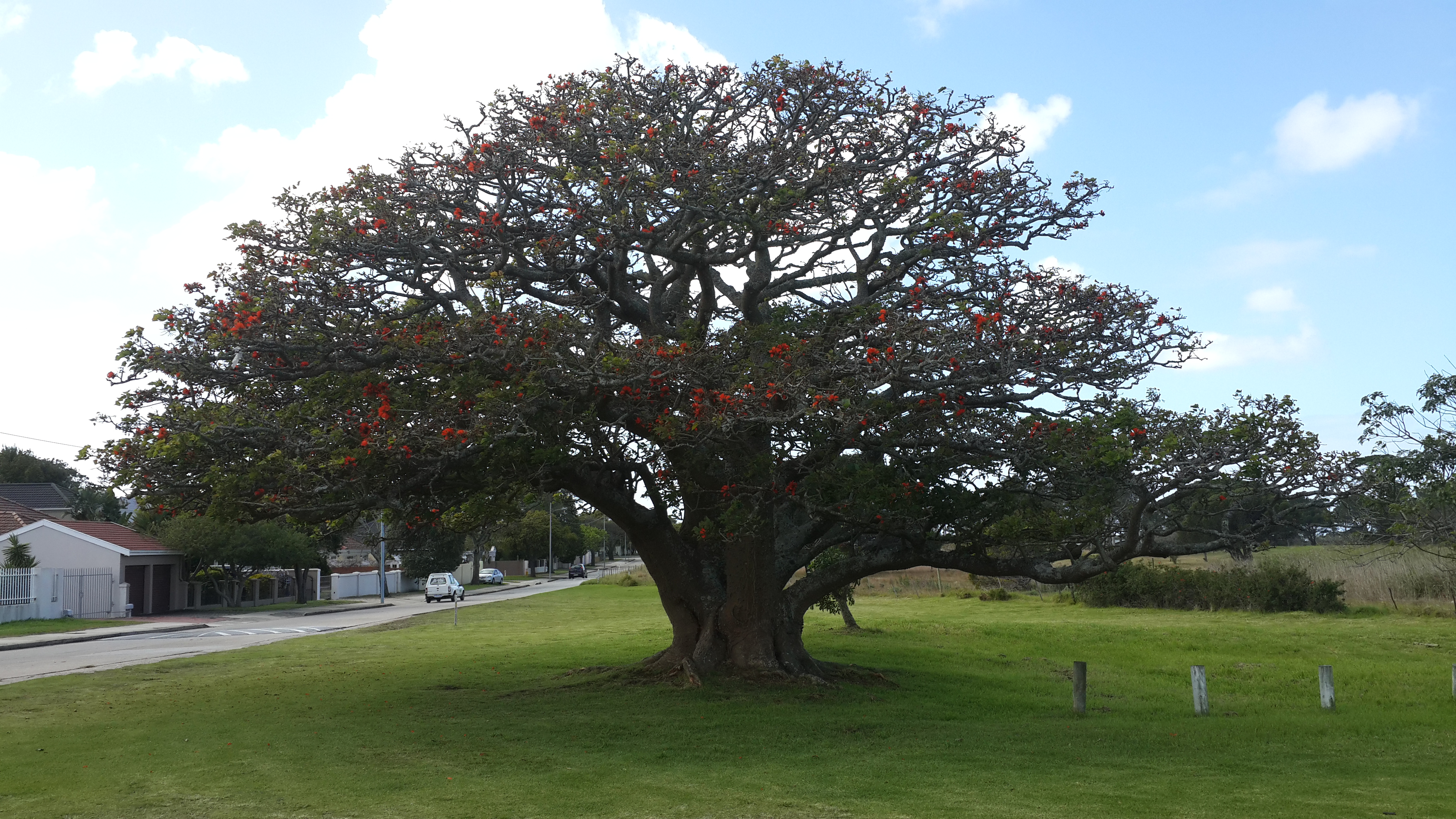
Erythrina afra free growth habit

Erythrina afra is a medium to large deciduous tree. It grows in coastal bushes and riverine forests along the southeastern coast of South Africa and up into Zululand.

=== Leaves ===
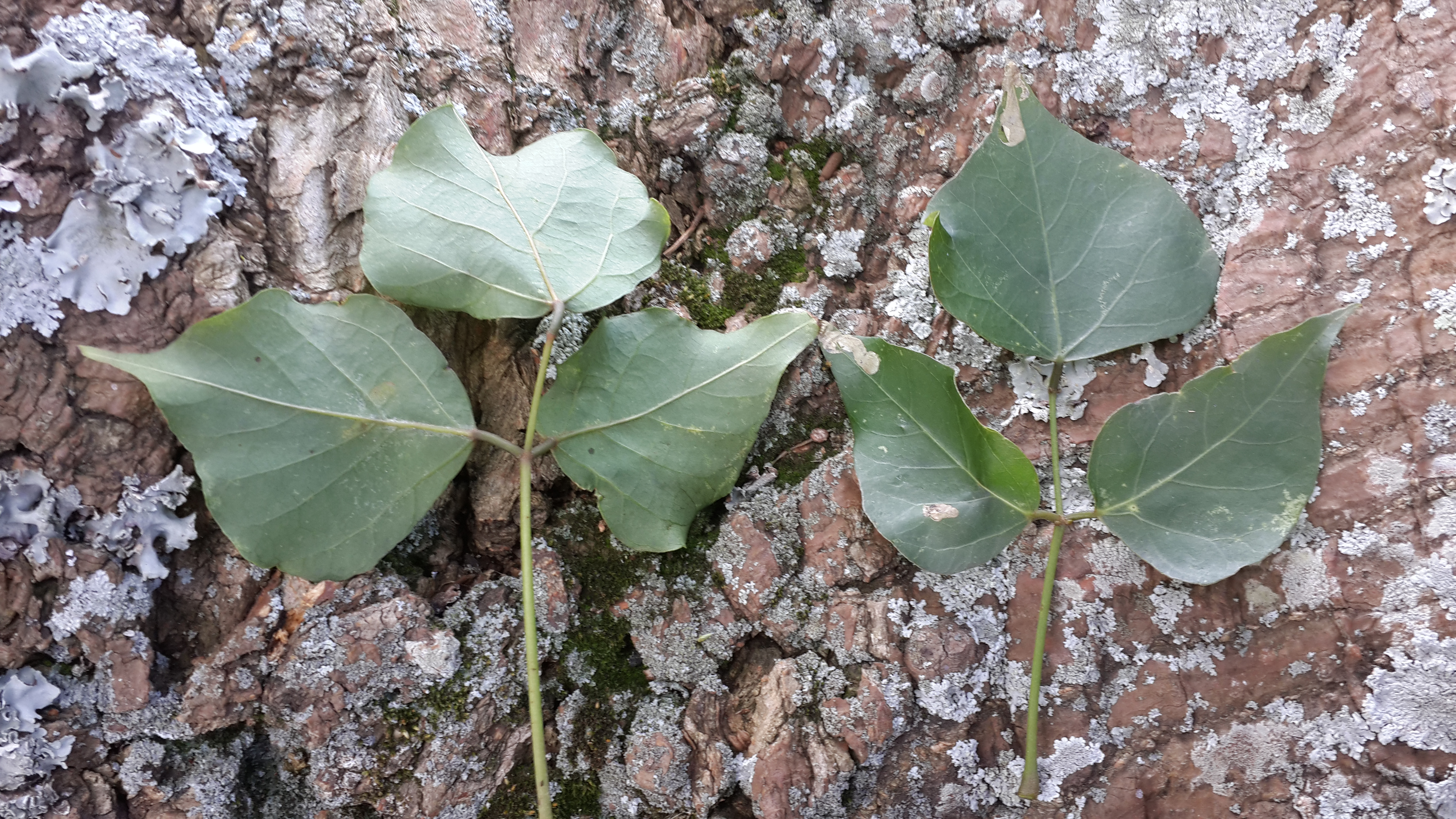
Leaves

The compound leaves are made up of three leaflets. Each leaflet is broadly ovate to elliptical. The leaflets do not have prickles and are hairless.

=== Flowers ===
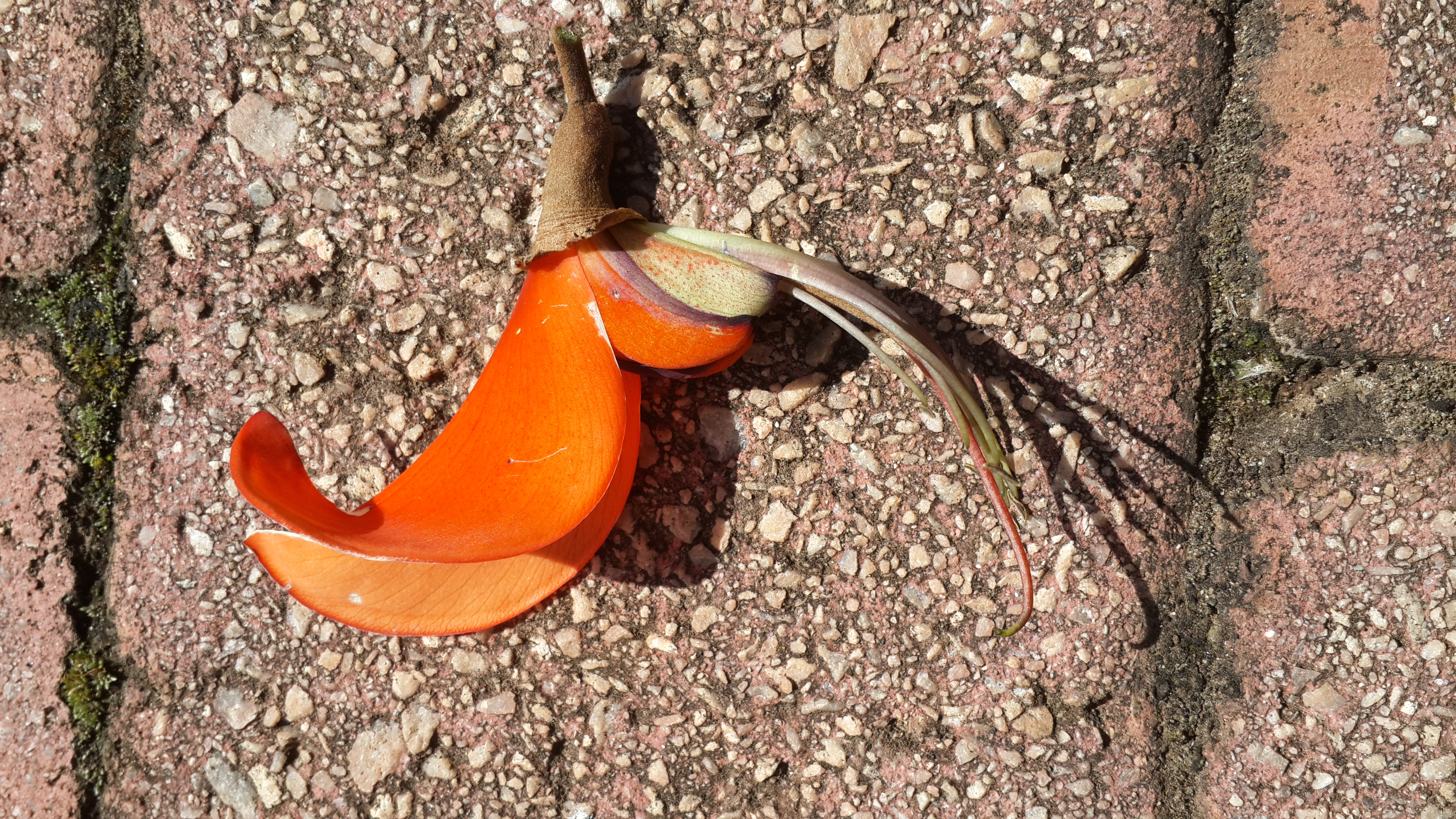
Flower

The flowers are made up of a main petal and four small petals. The main petal curves back to expose the stamens. The flower colour is warm red to scarlet. This is one of the main differences between Erythrina affra and Erythrina lysistemon. The flowers form stalked axillary racemes up to 100mm long.

=== Trunk ===
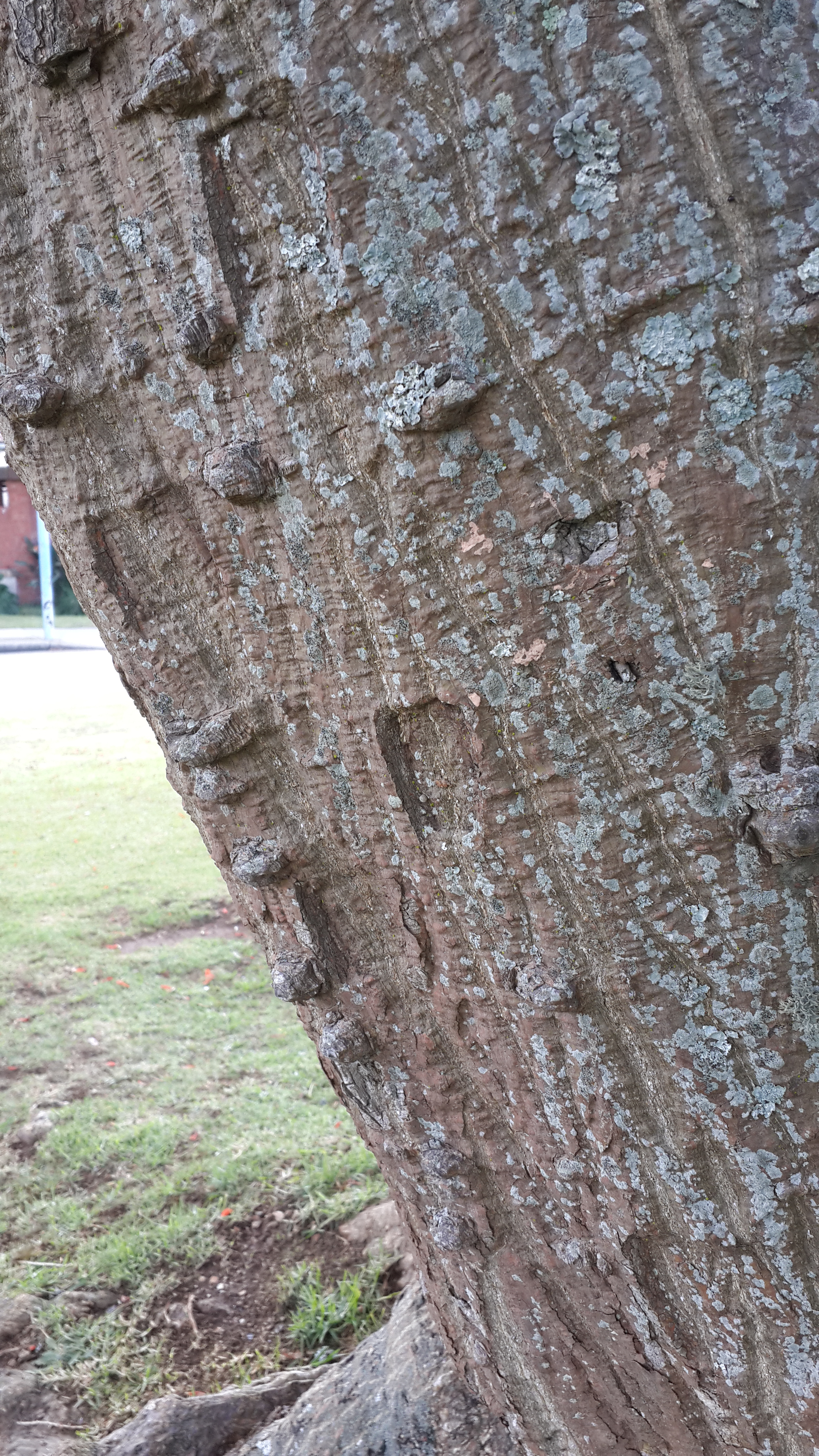
Erythrina afra trunk

The bark on the plant or tree is relatively smooth with intermittent thorns, and the thorns tend to be sharper on younger branches.

== Taxonomy ==
The original etymology of the species name caffra is related to kaffir, originally an Arabic term for unbeliever, but later an ethnic slur towards black people in parts of Africa. At the July 2024 International Botanical Congress, a vote was held with the result that "caffra" related names will be emended to afra related ones at the end of July 2024.

== Gallery ==
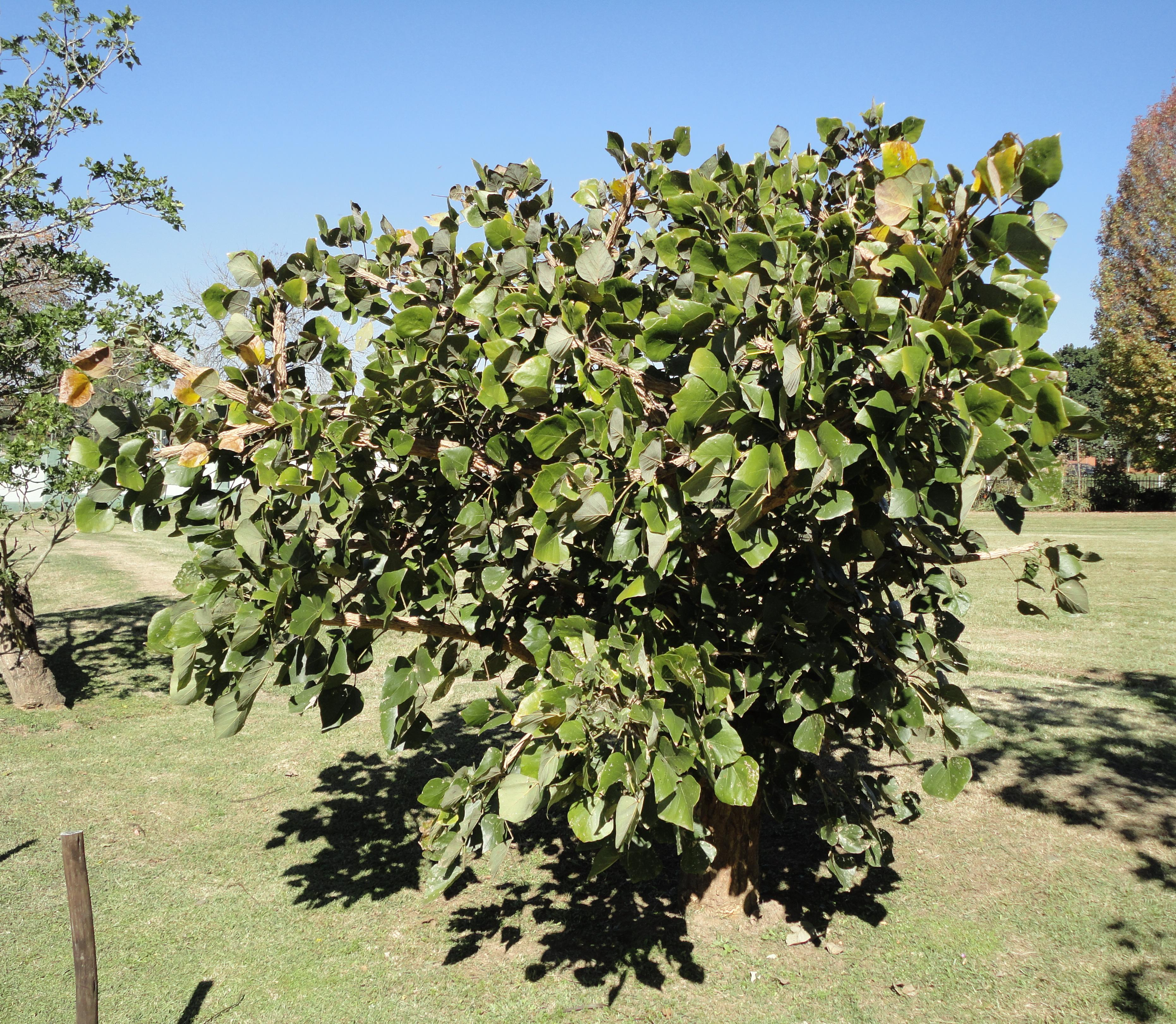
Close-up view, showing leaf arrangement, shape and size

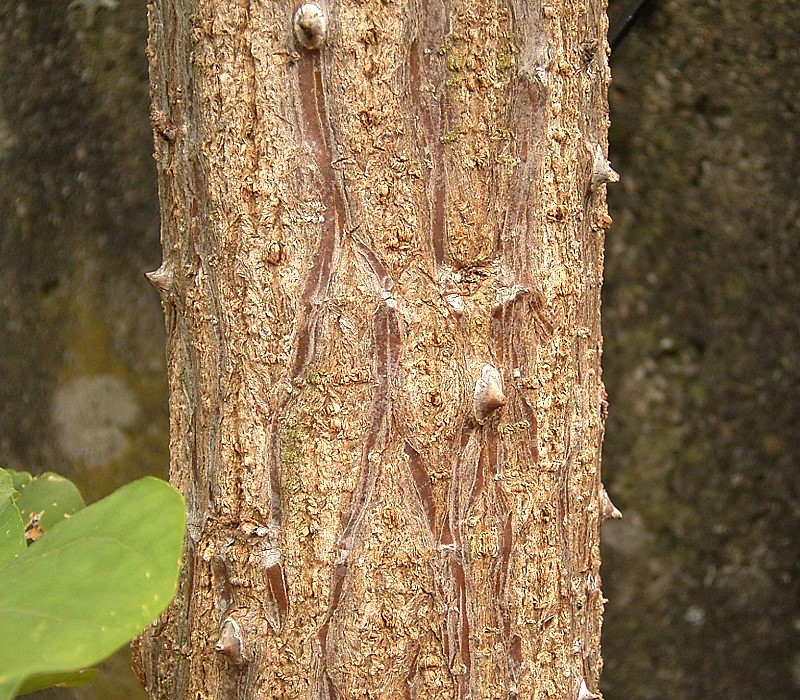
View of trunk showing prickles

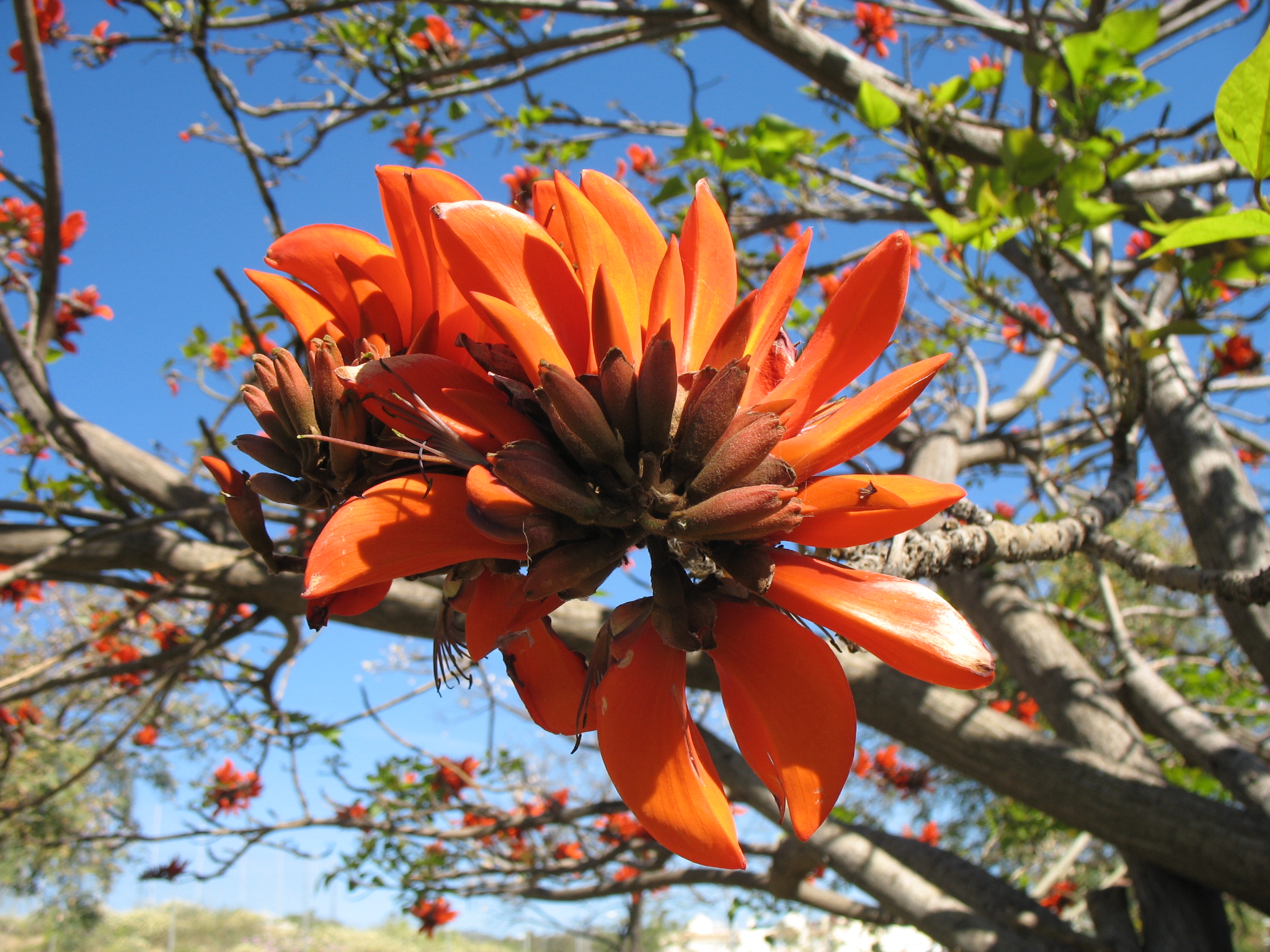
Inflorescence

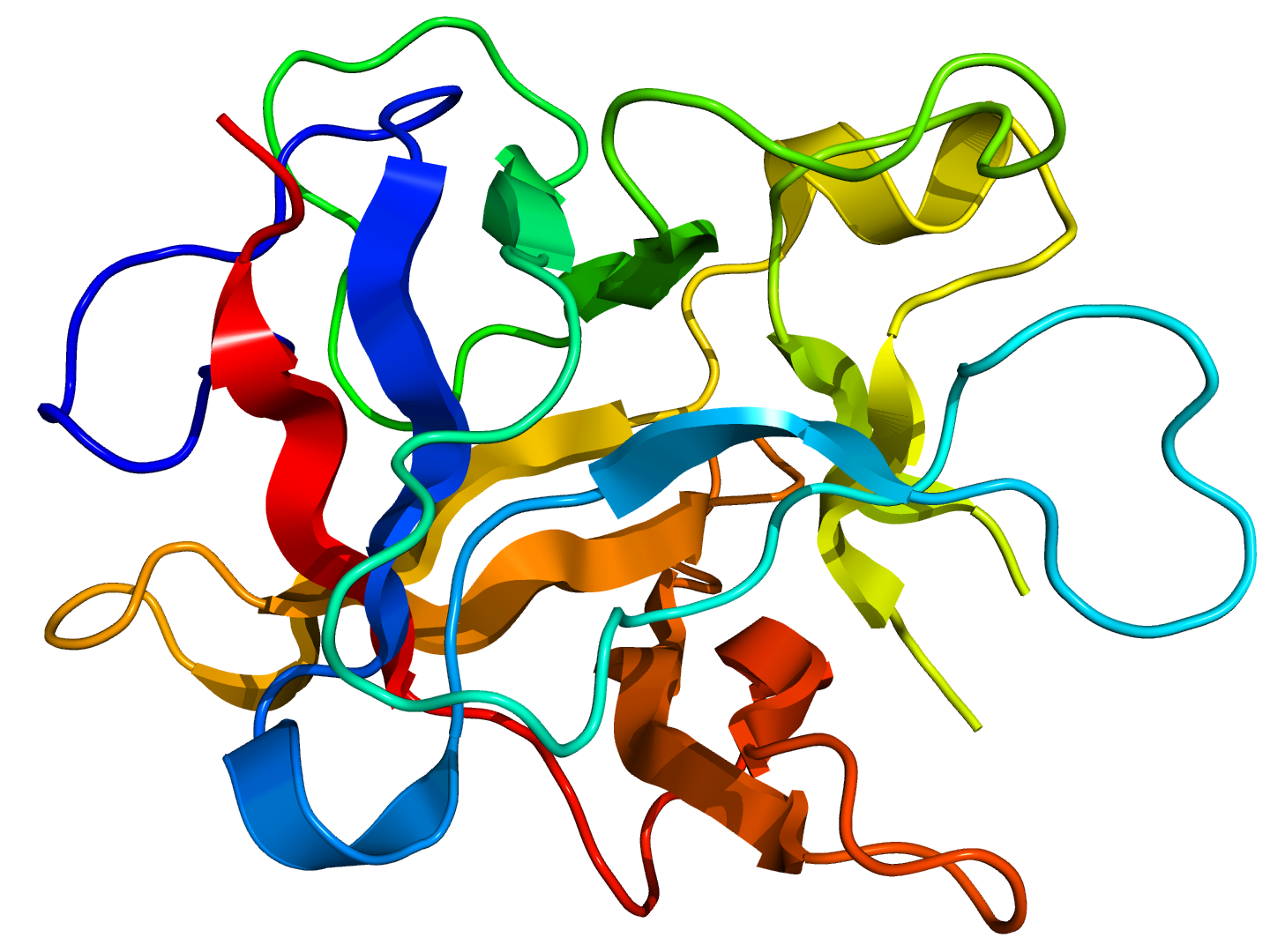
Trypsin inhibitor isolated from the seeds of Erythrina caffra
