= SPINT1 =

Protein-coding gene in the species Homo sapiens

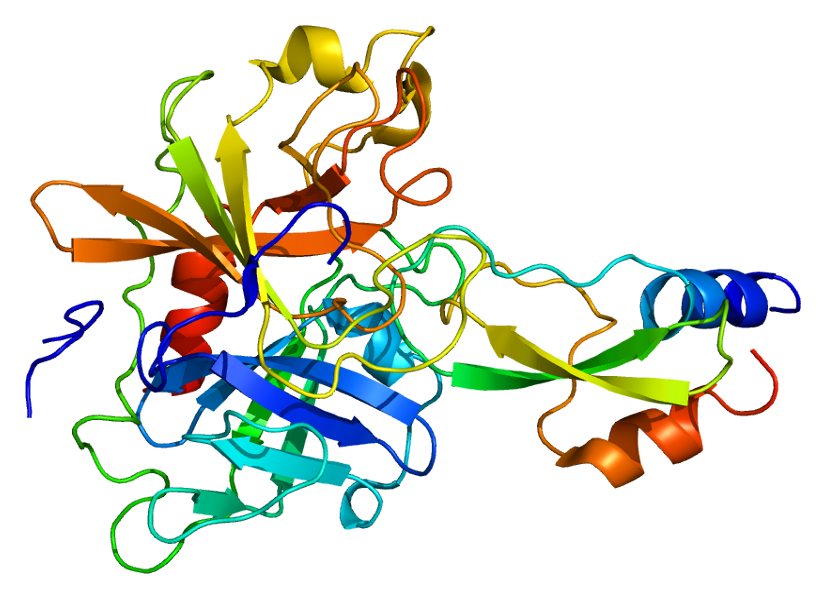

Identifiers
- Aliases: SPINT1, HAI, HAI1, MANSC2, serine peptidase inhibitor, Kunitz type 1
- External IDs: OMIM: 605123; MGI: 1338033; GeneCards: SPINT1
Available structures
PDB	Ortholog search: PDBe RCSB
PDB	List of PDB id codes 1YC0, 2MSX, 4ISL, 4ISN, 4ISO, 5EZD

Gene location (Human)
Chr.	Chromosome 15 (human)
Band	15q15.1	Start	40,844,018 bp
Band	15q15.1	End	40,858,207 bp

Gene location (Mouse)
Chr.	Chromosome 2 (mouse)
Band	2|2 E5	Start	119,067,843 bp
Band	2|2 E5	End	119,080,008 bp
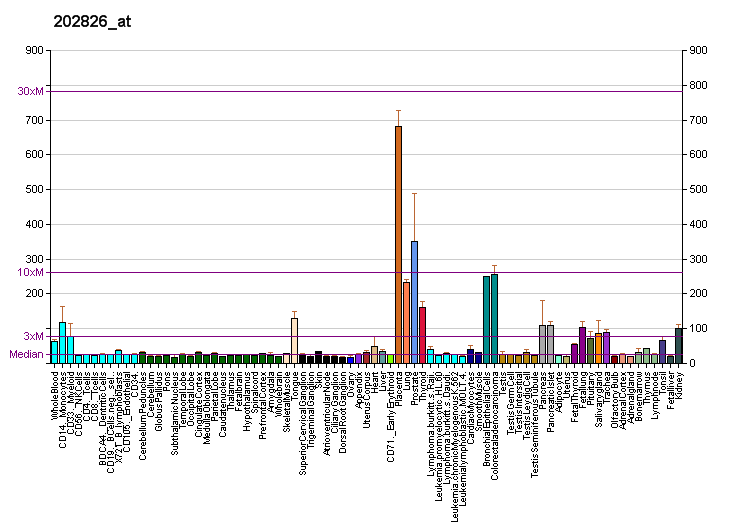
RNA expression pattern
Bgee	Human / Mouse (ortholog); Top expressed in: mucosa of transverse colon; jejunal mucosa; skin of abdomen; skin of leg; minor salivary glands; duodenum; olfactory zone of nasal mucosa; rectum; islet of Langerhans; right uterine tube / Top expressed in: left colon; duodenum; crypt of lieberkuhn of small intestine; transitional epithelium of urinary bladder; ileum; lip; corneal stroma; jejunum; vestibular membrane of cochlear duct; esophagus; More reference expression data
BioGPS	More reference expression data
Gene ontology
Molecular function	peptidase inhibitor activity; serine-type endopeptidase inhibitor activity
Cellular component	extracellular region; extracellular exosome; membrane; extracellular space; plasma membrane
Biological process	negative regulation of peptidase activity; negative regulation of endopeptidase activity; neural tube closure; embryonic placenta development; extracellular matrix organization; positive regulation of glial cell differentiation; branching involved in labyrinthine layer morphogenesis; placenta blood vessel development; cellular response to BMP stimulus; negative regulation of neural precursor cell proliferation
Sources:Amigo / QuickGO
Orthologs
Databases	NCBI: entry; OMA: entry
Species	Human	Mouse
Entrez	6692	20732
Ensembl	ENSG00000166145	ENSMUSG00000027315
UniProt	O43278	Q9R097
RefSeq (mRNA)	NM_001032367; NM_003710; NM_181642; NM_001386873; NM_001386874 NM_001386875	NM_016907
RefSeq (protein)	NP_001027539; NP_003701; NP_857593	NP_058603
Location (UCSC)	Chr 15: 40.84 – 40.86 Mb	Chr 2: 119.07 – 119.08 Mb
PubMed search
- Wikidata
View/Edit Human	View/Edit Mouse

Kunitz-type protease inhibitor 1 is an enzyme that in humans is encoded by the SPINT1 gene.

The protein encoded by this gene is a member of the Kunitz family of serine protease inhibitors. The protein is a potent inhibitor specific for HGF activator and is thought to be involved in the regulation of the proteolytic activation of HGF in injured tissues. Alternative splicing results in multiple variants encoding different isoforms.
