= Moses Kunitz =

Russian-American biochemist

- Born: December 19, 1887; Slonim, Russian Empire
- Died: April 20, 1978 (aged 90); Philadelphia, United States
- Resting place: Wellwood Cemetery, Long Island
- Citizenship: American
- Education: Cooper Union, Columbia University
- Scientific career
- Fields: Enzymology
- Institutions: Rockefeller University

Moses Kunitz (December 19, 1887 – April 20, 1978) was a Russian-American biochemist who spent most of his career at Rockefeller University. He is best known for a series of experiments in purification and crystallization of proteins, contributing to the determination that enzymes are proteins.

== Early life and education ==
Kunitz was born in Slonim (then part of Russia, now in Belarus) on December 19, 1887. He was raised and educated there until his move to the United States, where he settled in New York City in 1909 and became an American citizen in 1915. Kunitz graduated from Cooper Union with a degree in chemistry in 1916 and then enrolled there for graduate school in electrical engineering. After three years in the program, he moved to Columbia University, from which he received a Ph.D. in biological chemistry in 1924. Kunitz began work as a technical assistant in Jacques Loeb's laboratory at Rockefeller University in 1913 and continued there throughout his graduate years. Loeb arranged for Kunitz to receive a staff appointment at Rockefeller after graduation.

== Academic career ==
Kunitz' position at Rockefeller was originally secured by Jacques Loeb. After Loeb died in 1924, John H. Northrop succeeded him and retained Kunitz' position; the two would collaborate extensively on experiments involving protein crystallization for much of their remaining careers. Both Northrop and Kunitz moved to Rockefeller's Princeton, New Jersey campus in 1926; Kunitz returned to New York City in 1952. He then assumed professor emeritus status but continued to work regularly in the laboratory until eventually retiring in 1970.

Kunitz was awarded the Carl Neuberg Medal in 1957 in recognition of his long research career and noted technical skill in the laboratory, which was critical to his long series of successes in protein crystallization. He was elected to the National Academy of Sciences in 1967.

== Research ==
Kunitz is best known for his efforts in protein crystallization, successfully crystallizing a number of enzymes and enzyme precursor proteins, particularly proteases. Kunitz worked with trypsin and chymotrypsin and their precursors, as well as pepsin. He also studied protease inhibitors and devoted particular effort to the soybean trypsin inhibitor; the inhibitor protein, its domain family, and a soybean cultivar lacking this protein are all named after him. For their role in isolating, purifying, and crystallizing enzymes - a subject underscored by Kunitz' work with Northrop - John H. Northrop, Wendell M. Stanley, and James B. Sumner were awarded the Nobel Prize in Chemistry in 1946. Kunitz himself was nominated three times for a share of a Nobel for this work.

In addition to his work on crystallization of proteases, Kunitz also performed careful work in enzymology, characterizing the kinetics and thermodynamics of protease reactions. He worked on other proteins as well, in particular ribonucleases, which were popular model systems for their small size and ease of crystallization. During World War II he worked on government-assigned crystallization projects and was noted for the facility with which he crystallized hexokinase. Kunitz was widely recognized specifically for his craftsmanship and technical skill in the laboratory.
