= TFPI2 =

Protein-coding gene in the species Homo sapiens

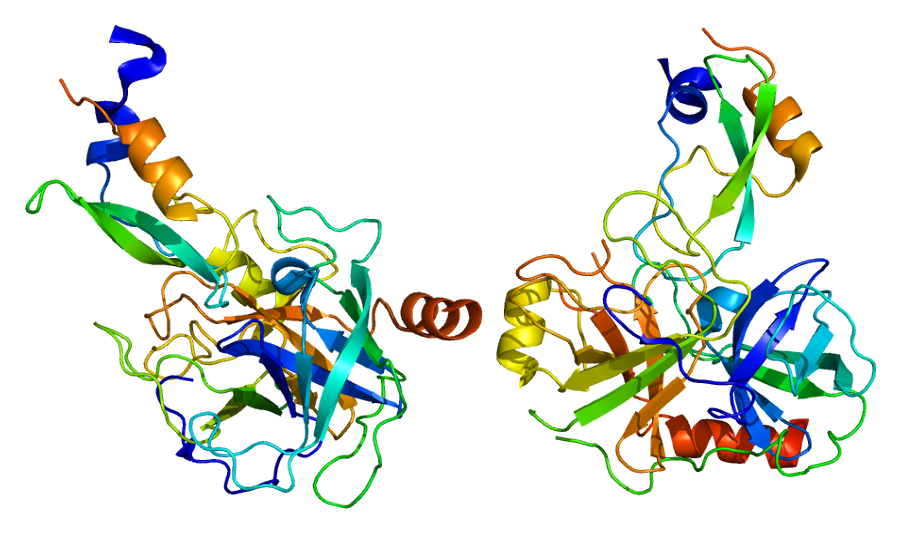
Available structures
PDB	Ortholog search: PDBe RCSB
PDB	List of PDB id codes 1ZR0

Identifiers
- Aliases: TFPI2, PP5, REF1, TFPI-2, tissue factor pathway inhibitor 2
- External IDs: OMIM: 600033; MGI: 108543; HomoloGene: 38194; GeneCards: TFPI2; OMA:TFPI2 - orthologs

Gene location (Human)
Chr.	Chromosome 7 (human)
Band	7q21.3	Start	93,885,396 bp
Band	7q21.3	End	93,890,753 bp

Gene location (Mouse)
Chr.	Chromosome 6 (mouse)
Band	6 A1|6 1.81 cM	Start	3,962,595 bp
Band	6 A1|6 1.81 cM	End	3,988,919 bp
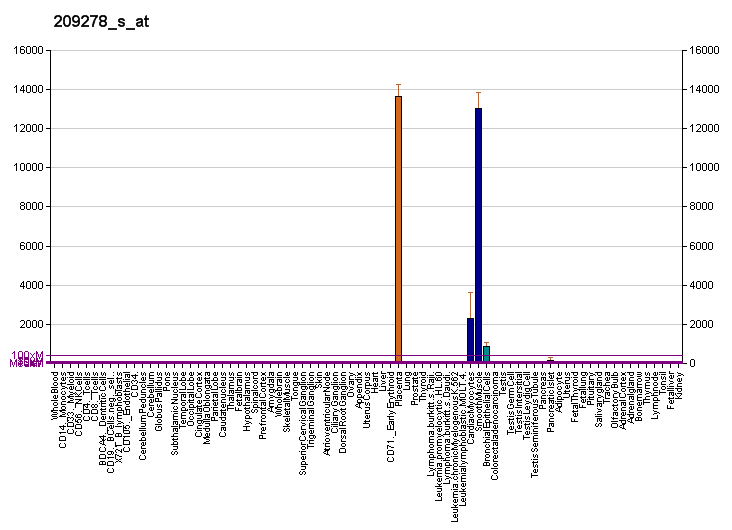

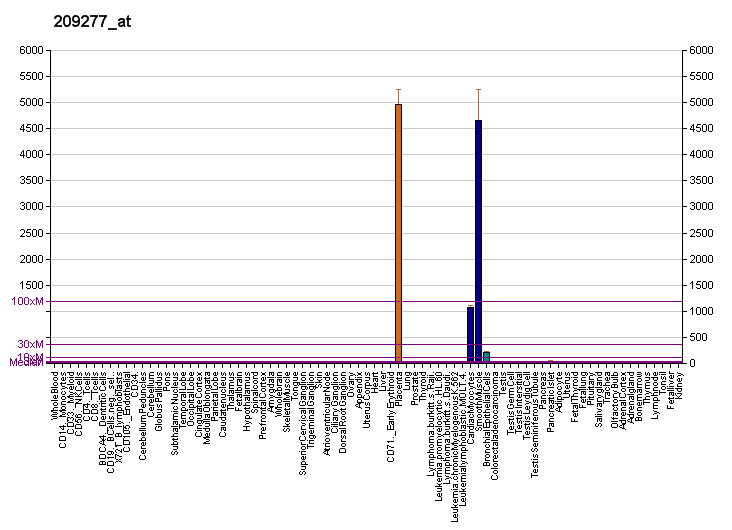
RNA expression pattern
Bgee	Human / Mouse (ortholog); Top expressed in: stromal cell of endometrium; parietal pleura; islet of Langerhans; cartilage tissue; retinal pigment epithelium; germinal epithelium; pericardium; placenta; beta cell; gonad / Top expressed in: decidua; left lobe of liver; endothelial cell of lymphatic vessel; right kidney; gastrula; human kidney; atrioventricular valve; embryo; migratory enteric neural crest cell; yolk sac; More reference expression data
BioGPS	More reference expression data
Gene ontology
Molecular function	peptidase inhibitor activity; extracellular matrix structural constituent; serine-type endopeptidase inhibitor activity
Cellular component	extracellular region; extracellular matrix; extracellular space
Biological process	hemostasis; negative regulation of peptidase activity; blood coagulation; negative regulation of endopeptidase activity; cellular response to fluid shear stress
Sources:Amigo / QuickGO
Orthologs
Species	Human	Mouse
Entrez	7980	21789
Ensembl	ENSG00000105825	ENSMUSG00000029664
UniProt	P48307	O35536
RefSeq (mRNA)	NM_006528; NM_001271003; NM_001271004	NM_009364; NM_001381907; NM_001381908
RefSeq (protein)	NP_001257932; NP_001257933; NP_006519	NP_033390; NP_001368836; NP_001368837
Location (UCSC)	Chr 7: 93.89 – 93.89 Mb	Chr 6: 3.96 – 3.99 Mb
PubMed search
- Wikidata
View/Edit Human	View/Edit Mouse

Tissue factor pathway inhibitor 2 is a protein that in humans is encoded by the TFPI2 gene.
