= Bowman–Birk protease inhibitor =

Bowman–Birk leg
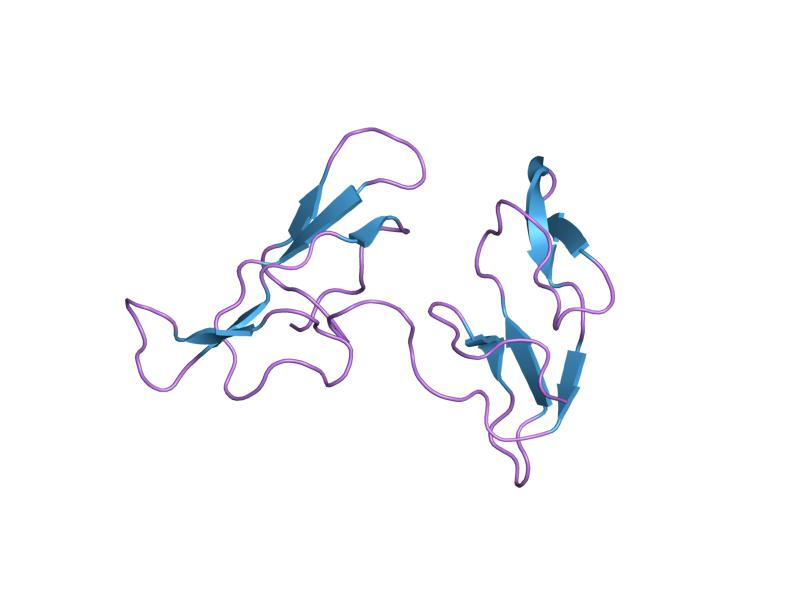
- High resolution structure of barley Bowman-Birk protease inhibitor

Identifiers
- Symbol: Bowman-Birk_leg
- Pfam: PF00228
- InterPro: IPR000877
- PROSITE: PDOC00253
- SCOP2: 1pi2 / SCOPe / SUPFAM
- CDD: cd00023
Available protein structures:
- PDB: IPR000877 PF00228 (ECOD; PDBsum)
- AlphaFold: IPR000877; PF00228

In molecular biology, the Bowman–Birk protease inhibitor family of proteins consists of eukaryotic proteinase inhibitors, belonging to MEROPS inhibitor family I12, clan IF. They mainly inhibit serine peptidases of the S1 family, but also inhibit S3 peptidases.

Members of this family have a duplicated structure and generally possess two distinct inhibitory sites. These inhibitors are primarily found in plants and in particular in the seeds of legumes, as well as in cereal grains. In cereals, they exist in two forms, one of which is a duplication of the basic structure. Proteins of the Bowman–Birk inhibitor family of serine proteinase inhibitors interact with the enzymes they inhibit via an exposed surface loop that adopts the canonical proteinase inhibitory conformation. The resulting noncovalent complex renders the proteinase inactive. This inhibition mechanism is common for the majority of serine proteinase inhibitor proteins, and many analogous examples are known. A particular feature of the Bowman–Birk inhibitor protein, however, is that the interacting loop is a particularly well-defined, disulfide-linked, short beta-sheet region.

== See also ==
Kunitz STI protease inhibitor
