= Protease inhibitor (biology) =

In biology and biochemistry, protease inhibitors, or antiproteases, are molecules that inhibit the function of proteases (enzymes that aid the breakdown of proteins). Many naturally occurring protease inhibitors are proteins.

In medicine, protease inhibitor is often used interchangeably with alpha 1-antitrypsin (A1AT, which is abbreviated PI for this reason). A1AT is indeed the protease inhibitor most often involved in disease, namely in alpha-1 antitrypsin deficiency.

== Classification ==
Protease inhibitors may be classified either by the type of protease they inhibit, or by their mechanism of action. In 2004 Rawlings and colleagues introduced a classification of protease inhibitors based on similarities detectable at the level of amino acid sequence. This classification initially identified 48 families of inhibitors that could be grouped into 26 related superfamily (or clans) by their structure. According to the MEROPS database there are now 81 families of inhibitors. These families are named with an I followed by a number, for example, I14 contains hirudin-like inhibitors.

=== By protease ===
Classes of proteases are:

- Aspartic protease inhibitors
- Cysteine protease inhibitors
- Metalloprotease inhibitors
- Serine protease inhibitors
  - Trypsin inhibitors
    - Kunitz STI protease inhibitor
- Threonine protease inhibitors

=== By mechanism ===
Classes of inhibitor mechanisms of action are:

- Suicide inhibitor
- Transition state inhibitor
- Protein protease inhibitor (see serpins)
- Chelating agents

== Families ==
=== Inhibitor I4 ===
This is a family of protease suicide inhibitors called the serpins. It contains inhibitors of multiple cysteine and serine protease families. Their mechanism of action relies on undergoing a large conformational change which inactivates their target's catalytic triad.

=== Inhibitor I9 ===
Peptidase inhibitor I9
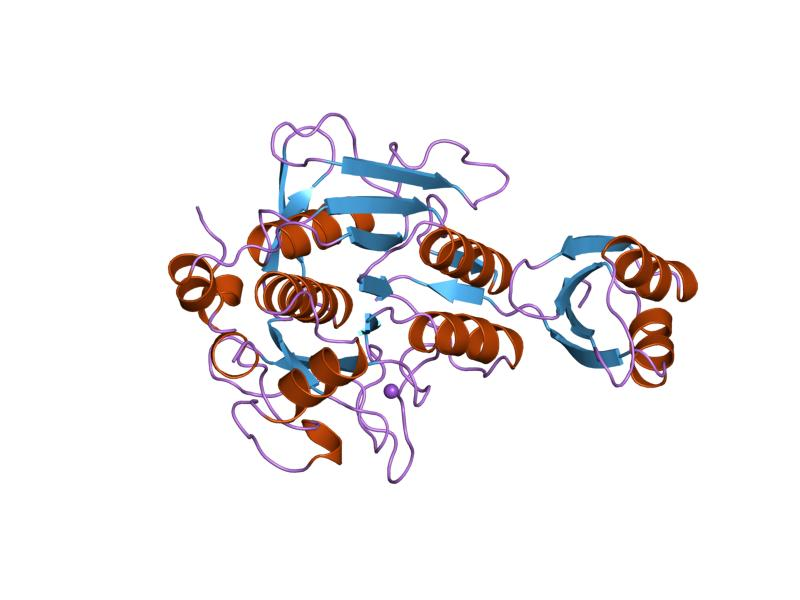
- subtilisin bpn' prosegment (77 residues) complexed with a mutant subtilisin bpn' (266 residues). crystal ph 4.6. crystallization temperature 20 c diffraction temperature-160 c

Identifiers
- Symbol: Inhibitor_I9
- Pfam: PF05922
- InterPro: IPR010259
- MEROPS: I9
- SCOP2: 1gns / SCOPe / SUPFAM
Available protein structures:
- PDB: IPR010259 PF05922 (ECOD; PDBsum)
- AlphaFold: IPR010259; PF05922

Proteinase propeptide inhibitors (sometimes referred to as activation peptides) are responsible for the modulation of folding and activity of the peptidase pro-enzyme or zymogen. The pro-segment docks into the enzyme, shielding the substrate binding site, thereby promoting inhibition of the enzyme. Several such propeptides share a similar topology, despite often low sequence identities. The propeptide region has an open-sandwich antiparallel-alpha/antiparallel-beta fold, with two alpha-helices and four beta-strands with a (beta/alpha/beta)x2 topology. The peptidase inhibitor I9 family contains the propeptide domain at the N-terminus of peptidases belonging to MEROPS family S8A, subtilisins. The propeptide is removed by proteolytic cleavage; removal activating the enzyme.

=== Inhibitor I10 ===
Serine endopeptidase inhibitors
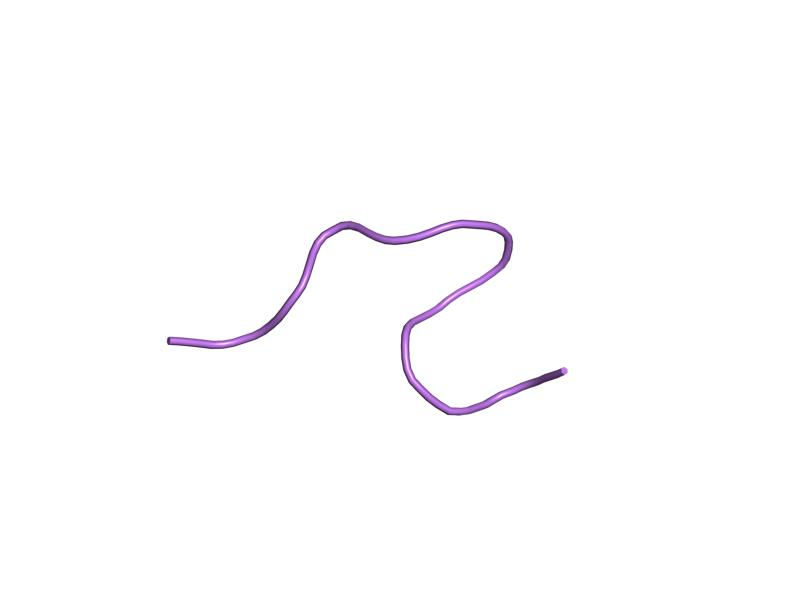
- solution structure of marinostatin, a protease inhibitor, containing two ester linkages

Identifiers
- Symbol: Inhibitor_I10
- Pfam: PF12559
- InterPro: IPR022217
Available protein structures:
- PDB: IPR022217 PF12559 (ECOD; PDBsum)
- AlphaFold: IPR022217; PF12559

This family includes both microviridins and marinostatins. It seems likely that in both cases it is the C-terminus which becomes the active inhibitor after post-translational modifications of the full length, pre-peptide. It is the ester linkages within the key, 12-residue region that circularise the molecule giving it its inhibitory conformation.

=== Inhibitor I24 ===
PinA peptidase inhibitor

Identifiers
- Symbol: Inhibitor_I24
- Pfam: PF10465
- InterPro: IPR019506
- MEROPS: I24
Available protein structures:
- PDB: IPR019506 PF10465 (ECOD; PDBsum)
- AlphaFold: IPR019506; PF10465

This family includes PinA, which inhibits the endopeptidase La. It binds to the La homotetramer but does not interfere with the ATP binding site or the active site of La.

=== Inhibitor I29 ===
Cathepsin propeptide inhibitor domain (I29)
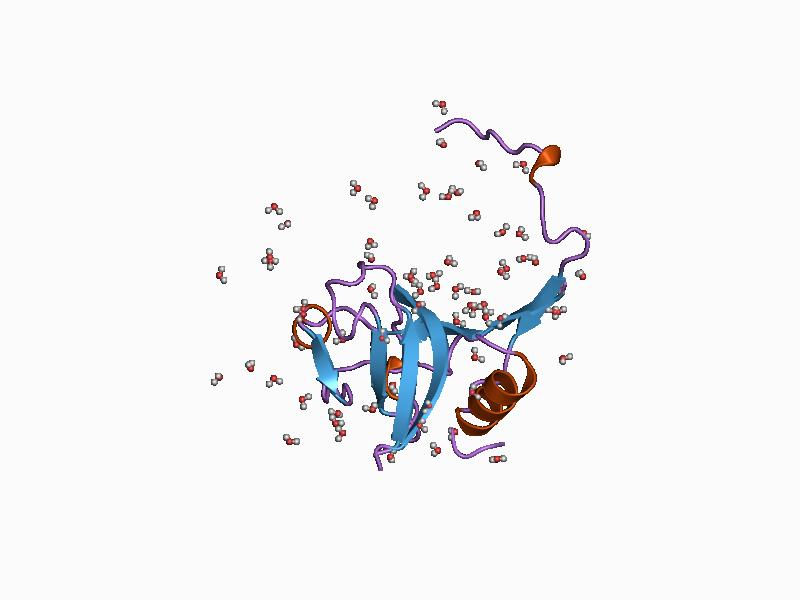
- crystal structure of a cysteine protease proform

Identifiers
- Symbol: Inhibitor_I29
- Pfam: PF08246
- InterPro: IPR013201
Available protein structures:
- PDB: IPR013201 PF08246 (ECOD; PDBsum)
- AlphaFold: IPR013201; PF08246

The inhibitor I29 domain, which belongs to MEROPS peptidase inhibitor family I29, is found at the N-terminus of a variety of peptidase precursors that belong to MEROPS peptidase subfamily C1A; these include cathepsin L, papain, and procaricain. It forms an alpha-helical domain that runs through the substrate-binding site, preventing access. Removal of this region by proteolytic cleavage results in activation of the enzyme. This domain is also found, in one or more copies, in a variety of cysteine peptidase inhibitors such as salarin.

=== Inhibitor I34 ===
Saccharopepsin inhibitor I34
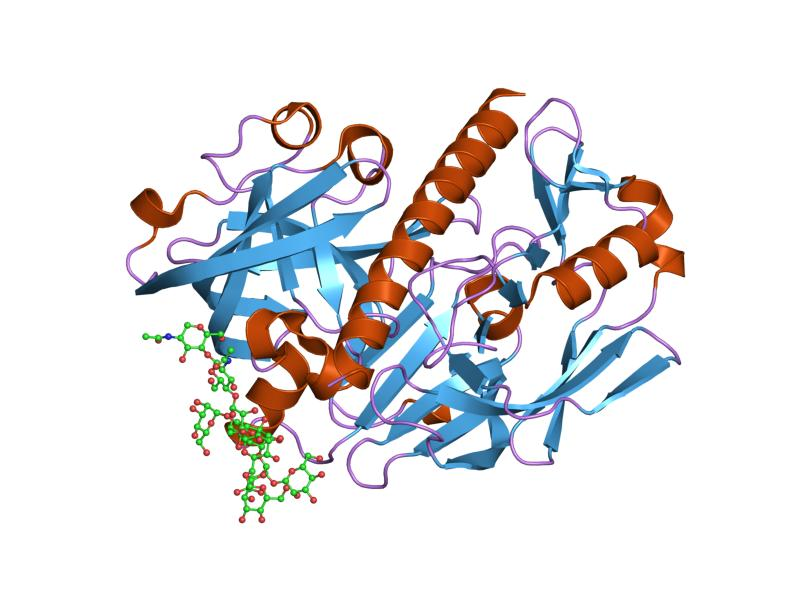
- the structure of proteinase a complexed with an ia3 mutant inhibitor

Identifiers
- Symbol: Inhibitor_I34
- Pfam: PF10466
- InterPro: IPR019507
- MEROPS: I34
Available protein structures:
- PDB: IPR019507 PF10466 (ECOD; PDBsum)
- AlphaFold: IPR019507; PF10466

The saccharopepsin inhibitor I34 is highly specific for the aspartic peptidase saccharopepsin. In the absence of saccharopepsin it is largely unstructured, but in its presence, the inhibitor undergoes a conformational change forming an almost perfect alpha-helix from Asn2 to Met32 in the active site cleft of the peptidase.

=== Inhibitor I36 ===
Peptidase inhibitor family I36
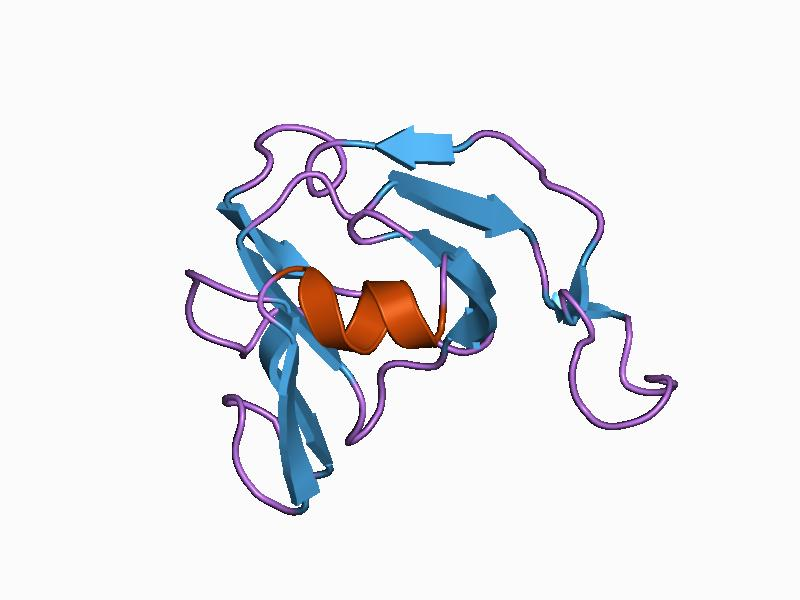
- the 3d structure of the streptomyces metalloproteinase inhibitor, smpi, isolated from streptomyces nigrescens tk-23, nmr, minimized average structure

Identifiers
- Symbol: Inhibitor_I36
- Pfam: PF03995
- Pfam clan: CL0333
- InterPro: IPR007141
- MEROPS: I36
- SCOP2: 1bhu / SCOPe / SUPFAM
Available protein structures:
- PDB: IPR007141 PF03995 (ECOD; PDBsum)
- AlphaFold: IPR007141; PF03995

The peptidase inhibitor family I36 domain is only found in a small number of proteins restricted to Streptomyces species. All have four conserved cysteines that probably form two disulphide bonds. One of these proteins from Streptomyces nigrescens, is the well characterised metalloproteinase inhibitor SMPI.

The structure of SMPI has been determined. It has 102 amino acid residues with two disulphide bridges and specifically inhibits metalloproteinases such as thermolysin, which belongs to MEROPS peptidase family M4. SMPI is composed of two beta-sheets, each consisting of four antiparallel beta-strands. The structure can be considered as two Greek key motifs with 2-fold internal symmetry, a Greek key beta-barrel. One unique structural feature found in SMPI is in its extension between the first and second strands of the second Greek key motif which is known to be involved in the inhibitory activity of SMPI. In the absence of sequence similarity, the SMPI structure shows clear similarity to both domains of the eye lens crystallins, both domains of the calcium sensor protein-S, as well as the single-domain yeast killer toxin. The yeast killer toxin structure was thought to be a precursor of the two-domain beta gamma-crystallin proteins, because of its structural similarity to each domain of the beta gamma-crystallins. SMPI thus provides another example of a single-domain protein structure that corresponds to the ancestral fold from which the two-domain proteins in the beta gamma-crystallin superfamily are believed to have evolved.

=== Inhibitor I42 ===
Chagasin family peptidase inhibitor I42
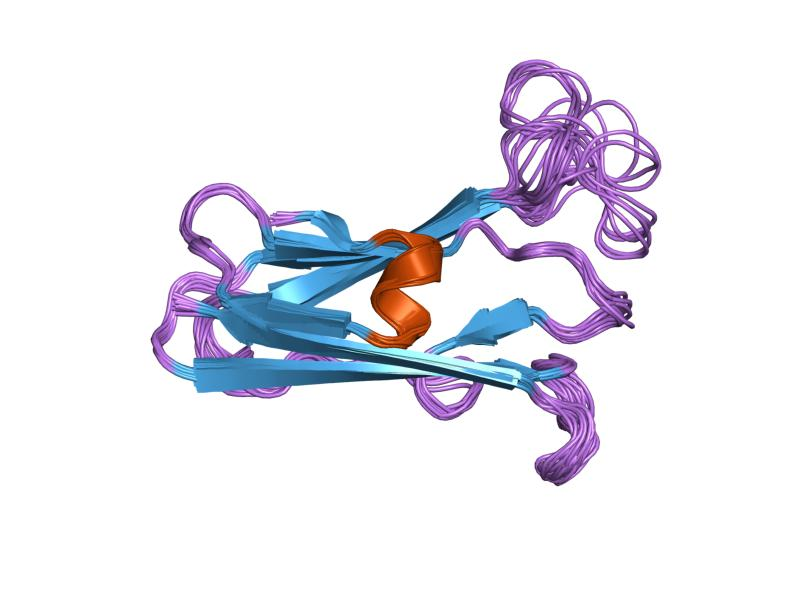
- solution structure of the trypanosoma cruzi cysteine protease inhibitor chagasin

Identifiers
- Symbol: Inhibitor_I42
- Pfam: PF09394
- InterPro: IPR018990
- MEROPS: I42
Available protein structures:
- PDB: IPR018990 PF09394 (ECOD; PDBsum)
- AlphaFold: IPR018990; PF09394

Inhibitor family I42 includes chagasin, a reversible inhibitor of papain-like cysteine proteases. Chagasin has a beta-barrel structure, which is a unique variant of the immunoglobulin fold with homology to human CD8alpha.

=== Inhibitor I48 ===
Peptidase inhibitor clitocypin

Identifiers
- Symbol: Inhibitor_I48
- Pfam: PF10467
- InterPro: IPR019508
- MEROPS: I48
Available protein structures:
- PDB: IPR019508 PF10467 (ECOD; PDBsum)
- AlphaFold: IPR019508; PF10467

Inhibitor family I48 includes clitocypin, which binds and inhibits cysteine proteinases. It has no similarity to any other known cysteine proteinase inhibitors but bears some similarity to a lectin-like family of proteins from mushrooms.

=== Inhibitor I53 ===
Thrombin inhibitor Madanin

Identifiers
- Symbol: Inhibitor_I53
- Pfam: PF11714
- InterPro: IPR021716
- MEROPS: I53
Available protein structures:
- PDB: IPR021716 PF11714 (ECOD; PDBsum)
- AlphaFold: IPR021716; PF11714

Members of this family are the peptidase inhibitor madanin proteins. These proteins were isolated from tick saliva.

=== Inhibitor I67 ===
Bromelain inhibitor VI
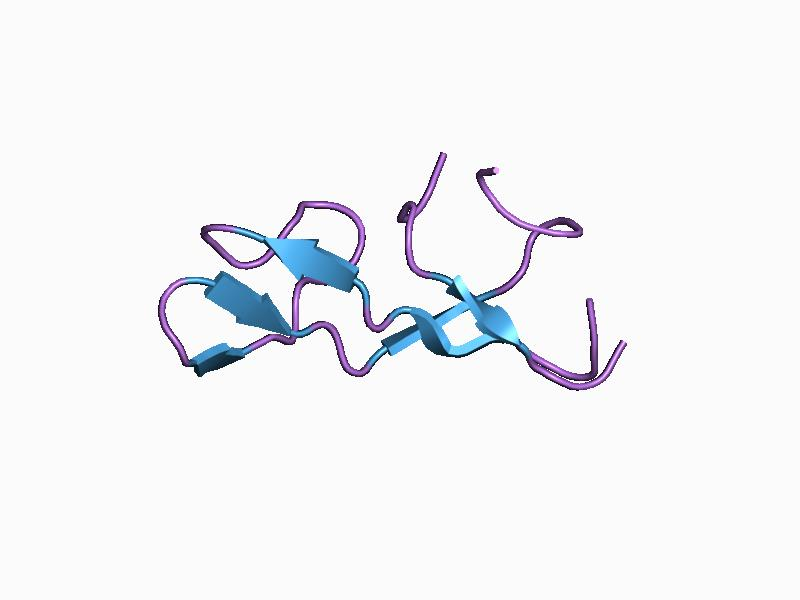
- nmr structure of bromelain inhibitor vi from pineapple stem

Identifiers
- Symbol: Inhibitor_I67
- Pfam: PF11405
- InterPro: IPR022713
- MEROPS: I67
Available protein structures:
- PDB: IPR022713 PF11405 (ECOD; PDBsum)
- AlphaFold: IPR022713; PF11405

Bromelain inhibitor VI, in the Inhibitor I67 family, is a double-chain inhibitor consisting of an 11-residue and a 41-residue chain.

=== Inhibitor I68 ===
Carboxypeptidase inhibitor I68
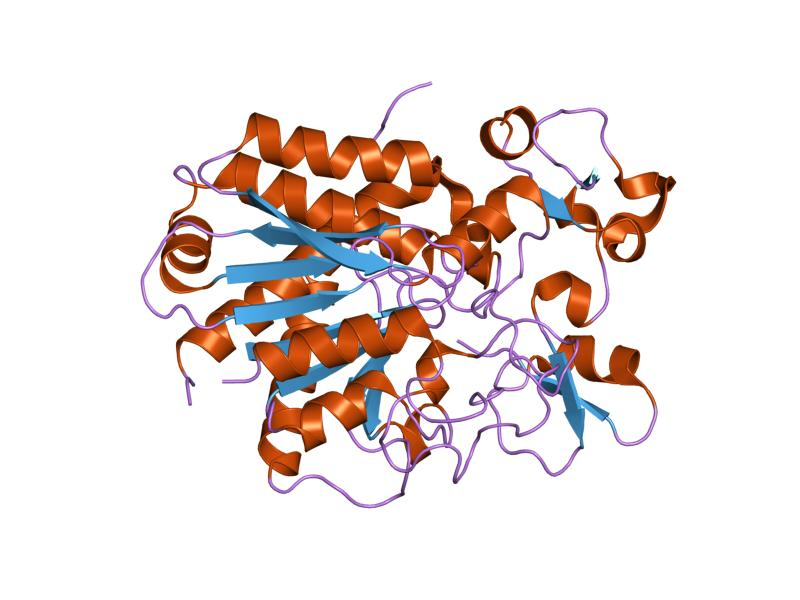
- crystal structure of the tick carboxypeptidase inhibitor in complex with human carboxypeptidase B

Identifiers
- Symbol: Inhibitor_I68
- Pfam: PF10468
- InterPro: IPR019509
- MEROPS: I68
Available protein structures:
- PDB: IPR019509 PF10468 (ECOD; PDBsum)
- AlphaFold: IPR019509; PF10468

The Carboxypeptidase inhibitor I68 family represents a family of carboxypeptidase inhibitors found in ticks.

=== Inhibitor I78 ===
Peptidase inhibitor I78 family

Identifiers
- Symbol: Inhibitor_I78
- Pfam: PF11720
- Pfam clan: CL0367
- InterPro: IPR021719
- MEROPS: I78
Available protein structures:
- PDB: IPR021719 PF11720 (ECOD; PDBsum)
- AlphaFold: IPR021719; PF11720

The peptidase inhibitor I78 family includes Aspergillus elastase inhibitor.

== Compounds ==
- Aprotinin
- Bestatin
- Calpain inhibitor I and II
- Chymostatin
- E-64
- Leupeptin (N-acetyl-L-leucyl-L-leucyl-L-argininal)
- alpha-2-Macroglobulin
- Pefabloc SC
- Pepstatin
- PMSF (phenylmethanesulfonyl fluoride)
- TLCK
- Trypsin inhibitors

== See also ==
- Kunitz domain
- Pacifastin
- Proteinase inhibitors in plants
