= Phlebology =

Medical speciality

Phlebology is a medical speciality that is concerned with venous issues including the diagnosis and treatment of disorders of the veins. A medical specialist in this field is known as a phlebologist. The specialty of phlebology has developed to enable physicians sharing an interest in venous disease and health to share knowledge and experience despite being trained in a variety of backgrounds such as dermatology, vascular surgery, haematology, interventional radiology or general medicine. Diagnostic techniques used include the patient's history and physical examination, venous imaging techniques, in particular, vascular ultrasound and laboratory evaluation related to venous thromboembolism. The American Medical Association and the American Osteopathic Association have added phlebology to their list of self-designated practice specialties.

== Scope of practice ==
A significant part of a phlebologist's work is involved with the treatment of superficial venous disease, frequently of the leg. Conditions often treated include venous stasis ulcers, varicose veins and spider veins (telangiectasia). Other conditions managed by phlebologists include deep venous thrombosis (DVT), superficial thrombophlebitis, and venous malformations.

Treatment of venous disorders

The management of venous disorders, including varicose veins, involves a range of approaches from conservative measures to minimally invasive endovascular procedures and traditional surgical interventions.

- Conservative management includes non-invasive approaches such as compression therapy, lifestyle modification, and pharmacological treatments. These methods aim to relieve symptoms and slow disease progression without removing or closing veins.
- Vascular Surgery: Surgical treatments have historically been the standard approach for varicose veins. Vein stripping, also referred to as phlebectomy, is a procedure in which a diseased vein - often the great saphenous vein - is removed through small incisions using a wire or probe. The procedure is usually performed under general anesthesia. Recovery may involve a hospital stay or day surgery, the application of compression dressings, and a period of limited physical activity. Surgical treatment of varicose veins is nowadays performed alongside less invasive procedures.
- Endovascular Surgery: Minimally invasive endovenous procedures are increasingly used in the treatment of varicose veins. Thermal techniques, which close affected veins using controlled heat, include endovenous laser treatment (EVLA or ELT), radiofrequency ablation, and steam ablation; these procedures have been in use since the late 1990s and early 2000s. Non-thermal techniques include foam sclerotherapy. Endovenous procedures are typically performed under local anesthesia (tumescent anesthesia). Clinical evidence from systematic reviews and randomized trials indicates that thermal endovenous procedures generally achieve success rates comparable to surgical stripping and are associated with shorter recovery periods and lower discomfort in the early postoperative period. Non‑thermal options such as foam sclerotherapy also have efficacy, though some analyses report higher early technical failure rates compared with thermal methods. Clinical practice guidelines from major international vascular societies indicate that for patients with symptomatic varicose veins and truncal reflux, endovenous ablation techniques (including endovenous laser treatment and radiofrequency ablation) are recommended as the first-line treatment in preference to high ligation and stripping.

== Societies and Associations ==
The Union Internationale de Phlébologie (UIP) is committed to the global expansion of knowledge in the growing field of phlebology and aims to facilitate the advancement of science by encouraging research and education in all aspects of venous and lymphatic disease. The Union is ultimately aiming to facilitate comprehensive training programs in its member countries with the ultimate aim of establishing phlebology as a recognised multidisciplinary specialty of medicine.

The Australasian College of Phlebology (ACP) founded in 1993 has established a comprehensive four-year training program in phlebology incorporating an online modular curriculum that complements supervised clinical training.

The American Medical Association added phlebology to their list of self-designated practice specialties in 2005. In 2007 the American Board of Phlebology (ABPh), subsequently known as the American Board of Venous & Lymphatic Medicine (ABVLM), was established to improve the standards of phlebologists and the quality of their patient care by establishing a certification examination, as well as requiring maintenance of certification. Although As of 2017 not a Member Board of the American Board of Medical Specialties (ABMS), the American Board of Venous & Lymphatic Medicine uses a certification exam based on ABMS standards.

The American Vein and Lymphatic Society (AVLS), formerly the American College of Phlebology (ACP) one of the largest medical societies in the world for physicians and allied health professionals working in the field of phlebology, has 2000 members. The AVLS encourages education and training to improve the standards of medical practitioners and the quality of patient care.

The American Venous Forum (AVF) is a medical society for physicians and allied health professionals dedicated to improving the care of patients with venous and lymphatic disease. The majority of its members manage the entire spectrum of venous and lymphatic diseases – from varicose veins to congenital abnormalities to deep vein thrombosis to chronic venous diseases. Founded in 1987, the AVF encourages research, clinical innovation, hands-on education, data collection and patient outreach.

== Certification ==
Regulatory requirements for phlebology certification are different in Europe and the US.

In the US, licensed physicians with documented experience in treating veins and adequate vascular ultrasound experience can receive certification by passing a test created by the American Board of Venous and Lymphatic Medicine a privately owned corporation committed to maintaining a high standard of care for venous disease. The test addresses knowledge of venous disease, clotting disorders, imaging modalities, pharmacokinetics, vascular malformations, lymphatics disorders and venous embryology. The American Board of Venous and Lymphatic Medicine results in certification as a "Diplomate of the American Board of Venous and Lymphatic Medicine" which is based on standards set by the American Board of Medical Specialities. Providers with this designation have completed rigorous criteria to sit for the exam and comprehension of vein care principles to pass the exam according to the Board.

In Australasia, the Australian College of Phlebologists requires that applicants be residents in Australia or New Zealand; have current registration as a medical practitioner in Australia or New Zealand; have a recognised post-graduate qualification (e.g., FRACGP) or more than 3 years post-graduate experience in clinical medicine; have a Medicare provider number to apply for advanced training; and are a person who has satisfied the prerequisites is eligible to apply for admission to the College Training Program. There is Basic Training (minimum of 10 days' supervised training, the Written Exam and the Clinical Exam), completion of which leads to the award of the title "Certified Sclerotherapist"; Advanced Training (20 days' supervised training, the Written Exam and the Clinical Exam); and Fellowship Training, completion of which leads to Fellowship of the Australasian College of Phlebology and entitlement to use the title "Phlebologist".
