= Chronic venous insufficiency =

Pooling of blood in the veins

- Other names: Chronic venous disease
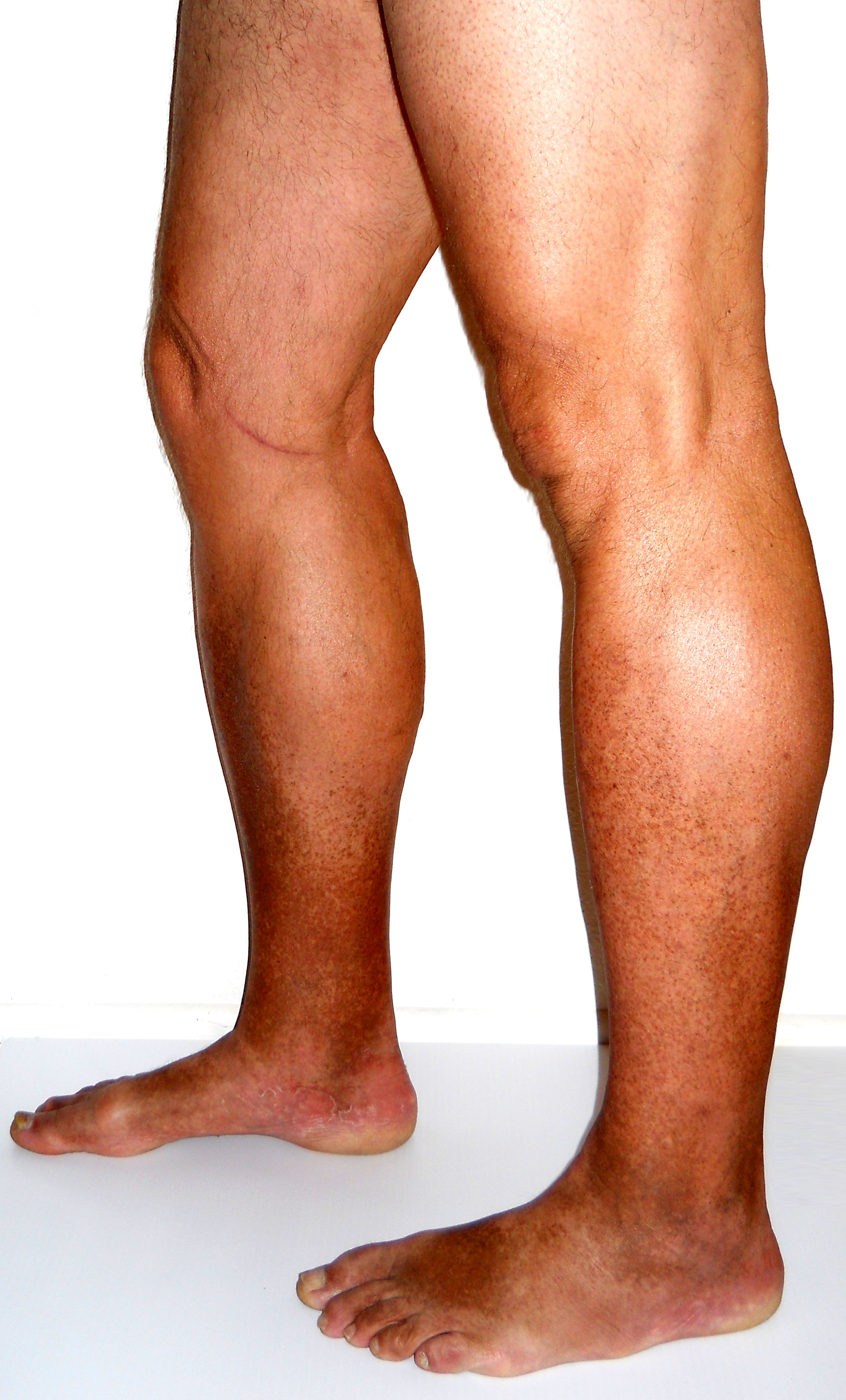
- Mild chronic venous insufficiency, with increased pigmentation of the lower legs
- Specialty: Vascular surgery

Chronic venous insufficiency (CVI) is a medical condition characterized by blood pooling in the veins, leading to increased pressure and strain on the vein walls. This is most commonly caused by blood flowing backwards in veins near the surface due to faulty valves, which can also result in the formation of varicose veins, a treatable condition. Since functional venous valves are necessary to facilitate efficient blood return from the lower extremities, CVI primarily affects the legs.

When impaired vein function leads to significant symptoms such as oedema (swelling) or venous ulcer formation, the condition is referred to as chronic venous disease. It is also known as chronic peripheral venous insufficiency and should not be confused with post-thrombotic syndrome, a separate condition caused by damage to the deep veins following deep vein thrombosis (DVT).

Most cases of CVI can be managed or improved through treatments targeting the superficial venous system or stenting the deep venous system. For instance, varicose veins are often treated using minimally invasive endovenous laser treatment performed under local anesthesia.

CVI is more prevalent in women than men, and additional risk factors include genetics, smoking, obesity, pregnancy, and prolonged standing.

== Signs and symptoms ==
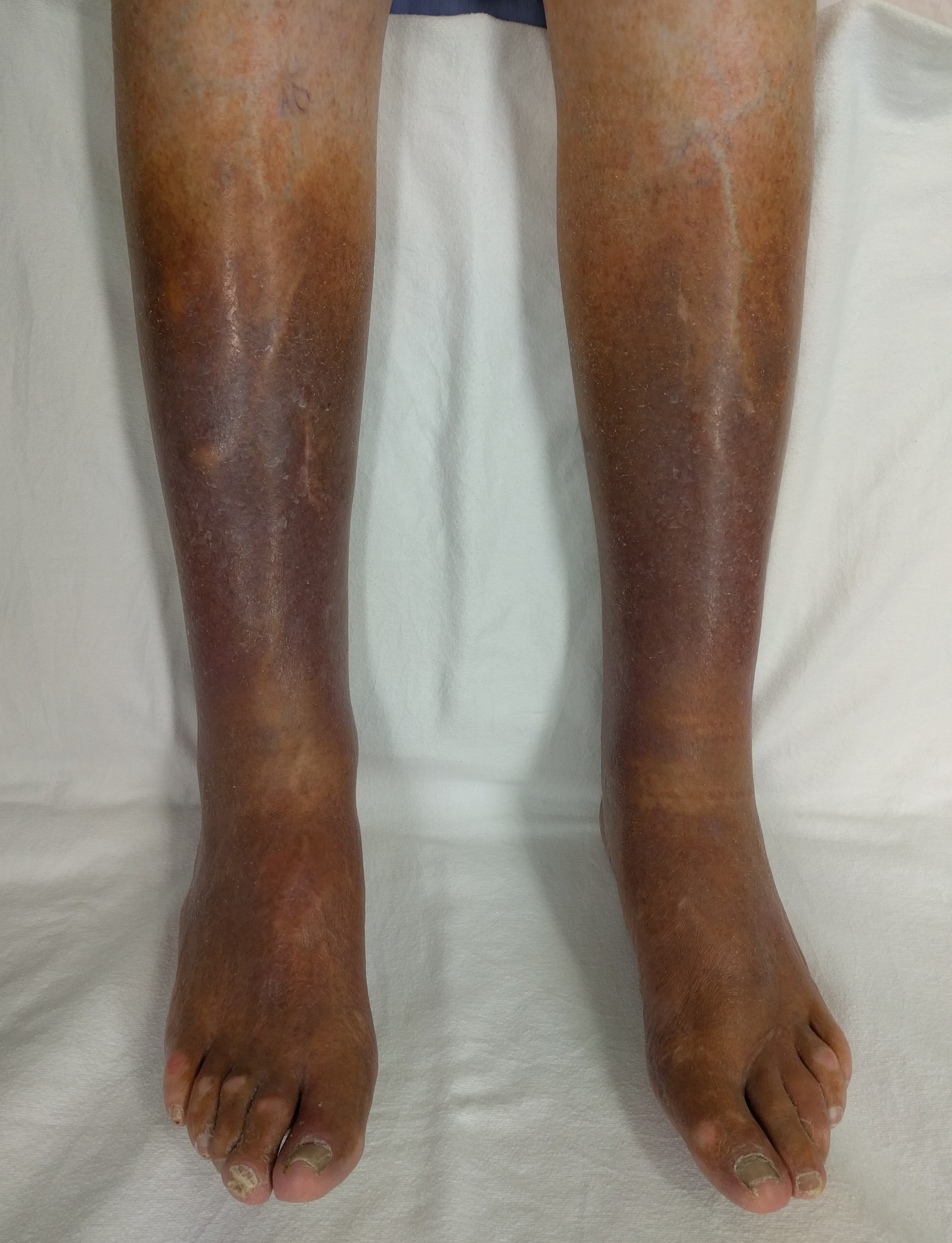
Chronic venous insufficiency

Signs and symptoms of CVI in the leg include the following:

- Varicose veins
- Itching (pruritus)
- Hyperpigmentation
- Phlebetic lymphedema
- Chronic swelling of the legs and ankles
- Leg ulcer

CVI in the leg may cause the following:

- Venous stasis
- Venous ulcers
- Stasis dermatitis, also known as varicose eczema
- Contact dermatitis, a disrupted epidermal barrier due to venous insufficiency, making patients more susceptible than the general population to contact sensitization and subsequent dermatitis.
- Atrophie blanche, an end point of a variety of conditions that appears as atrophic plaques of ivory white skin with telangiectasias. It represents late sequelae of lipodermatosclerosis where the skin has lost its nutrient blood flow.
- Lipodermatosclerosis, an indurated plaque in the medial malleolus.
- Malignancy, malignant degeneration being a rare but important complication of venous disease since tumors that develop in the setting of an ulcer tend to be more aggressive.
- Pain, a feature of venous disease often overlooked and commonly undertreated.
- Inflammation
- Cellulitis

== Causes ==
Venous valves

The most common cause of chronic venous insufficiency is blood flowing backwards in veins near the surface, known as superficial venous reflux. This occurs when valves in the veins fail to prevent backflow, which can have several causes including weakness in the vein wall, damage from blood clots, or congenital valve defects.

- Deep vein thrombosis (DVT), that is, blood clots in the deep veins. Chronic venous insufficiency caused by DVT may be described as postthrombotic syndrome. The blood clot traveling through the vein injures the valves and vein wall, which triggers a subsequent inflammatory response leading to the creation of scar tissue.
- Superficial vein thrombosis
- Phlebitis
- May–Thurner syndrome. This is a rare condition in which blood clots occur in the iliofemoral vein due to compression of the blood vessels in the leg. The specific problem is compression of the left common iliac vein by the overlying right common iliac artery.

May-Thurner compressions are often overlooked when there is no blood clot, however the use of modern imaging techniques has resulted in an increase in diagnosis and treatment. Treatment depends on severity, and can range from compression stockings to thrombolysis, angioplasty, or stenting.

Deep and superficial vein thrombosis may in turn be caused by thrombophilia, which is an increased propensity of forming blood clots.

Arteriovenous fistula (an abnormal connection or passageway between an artery and a vein) may cause chronic venous insufficiency even with working vein valves.

== Diagnosis ==
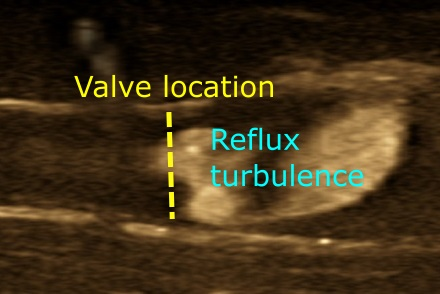
B-flow ultrasonograph over a valve of the great saphenous vein, showing a venous reflux (flow toward right in the image).

History and examination by a clinician for characteristic signs and symptoms are sufficient in many cases in ruling out systemic causes of venous hypertension such as hypervolemia and heart failure. A duplex ultrasound (Doppler ultrasonography and B-mode) can detect venous obstruction or valvular incompetence as the cause, and is used for planning venous ablation procedures, but it is not necessary in suspected venous insufficiency where surgical intervention is not indicated.

Insufficiency within a venous segment is defined as reflux of more than 0.5 seconds with distal compression. Invasive venography can be used in patients who may require surgery or have suspicion of venous stenosis. Other modalities that may be employed are: ankle-brachial index to exclude arterial pathology, air or photoplethysmography, intravascular ultrasound, and ambulatory venous pressures, which provides a global assessment of venous competence. Venous plethysmography can assess for reflux and muscle pump dysfunction but the test is laborious and rarely done.

The venous filling time after the patient is asked to stand up from a seated position also is used to assess for CVI. Rapid filling of the legs less than 20 seconds is abnormal.

=== Classification ===
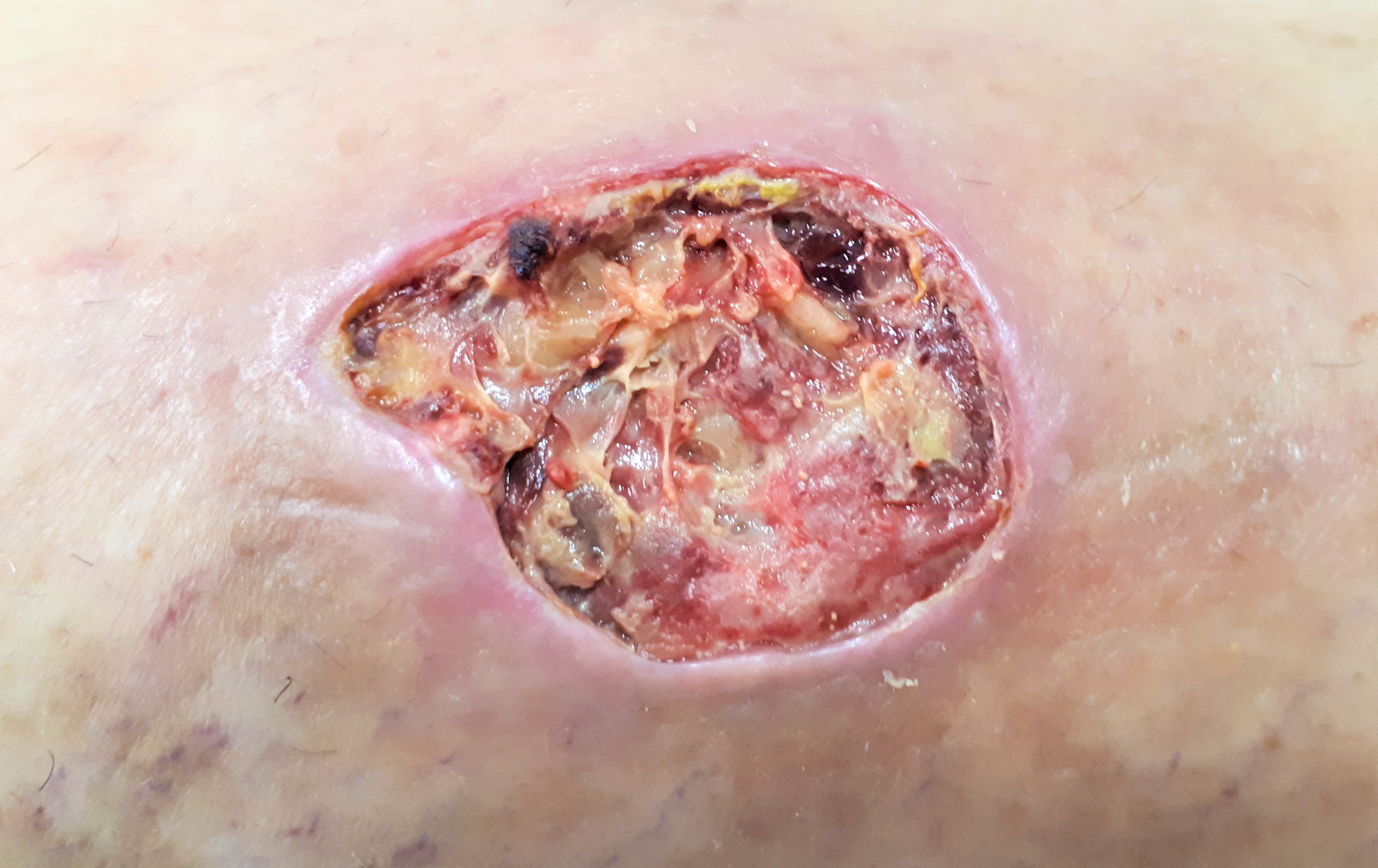
Acute venous ulcer (45 x 30 mm)

CEAP classification is based on Clinical, Etiological (causal), Anatomical, and Pathophysiological factors. According to Widmer Classification for assessment of chronic venous insufficiency (CVI), diagnosis of chronic venous insufficiency is clearly differentiated from varicose veins. It has been developed to guide decision-making in chronic venous insufficiency evaluation and treatment.

The CEAP classification for CVI is as follows:

- Clinical (C)
  - C0: No obvious feature of venous disease
  - C1: Presence of reticular or spider veins
  - C2: Obvious varicose veins
  - C3: Presence of edema but no skin changes
  - C4: skin discoloration, pigmentation
  - C5: Ulcer that has healed
  - C6: Acute ulcer
- Etiology (E)
  - Ep: Primary
  - Es: Secondary (trauma, birth control pill)
  - Ec: Congenital (Klippel–Trénaunay syndrome)
  - En: No cause is known
- Anatomic (A)
  - As: Superficial veins
  - Ad: Deep
  - Ap: Perforator
  - An: No obvious anatomic location
- Pathophysiology (P)
  - P0: Obstruction, thrombosis
  - Pr: Reflux
  - Pr/o: Obstruction and reflux
  - Pn: No venous pathology

== Management ==
=== Conservative ===
Conservative treatment of CVI in the leg involves symptomatic treatment and efforts to prevent the condition from getting worse instead of effecting a cure. This may include

- Manual compression lymphatic massage therapy
- Red vine leaf extract may have a therapeutic benefit.
- Sequential compression pump
- Ankle pump
- Compression stockings
- Blood pressure medicine
- Hydroxyethylrutoside medication
- Frequent periods of rest elevating the legs above the heart level
- Tilting the bed so that the feet are above the heart. This may be achieved by using a 20 cm (7-inch) bed wedge or sleeping in a 6 degree Trendelenburg position.

=== Surgical ===
Surgical treatment of CVI attempts a cure by physically changing the veins with incompetent valves. Surgical treatments for CVI include the following:

- Ligation. Tying off a vein to prevent blood flow
- Vein stripping. Removal of the vein.
- Surgical repair.
- Endovenous Laser Ablation
- Vein transplant.
- Subfascial endoscopic perforator surgery. Tying off the vein with an endoscope.
- Valve repair (experimental)
- Valve transposition (experimental)
- Hemodynamic surgeries.

Venous insufficiency conservative, hemodynamic and ambulatory treatment (CHIVA method) is an ultrasound guided, minimally invasive surgery strategic for the treatment of varicose veins, performed under local anaesthetic.

== Prognosis ==
CVI is not a benign disorder and, with its progression, can lead to morbidity and mortality. Venous ulcers are common and very difficult to treat. Chronic venous ulcers are painful and debilitating. Even with treatment, recurrences are common if venous hypertension persists. Nearly 60% develop phlebitis, which often progresses to deep vein thrombosis in more than 50% of patients. The venous insufficiency can also lead to severe hemorrhage. Surgery for CVI remains unsatisfactory despite the availability of numerous procedures.
