= Venous insufficiency =

Venous insufficiency can refer to:

- Varicose veins
- Chronic venous insufficiency
- Venous stasis
