= Hemosiderin hyperpigmentation =

Pigmentation due to deposits of hemosiderin

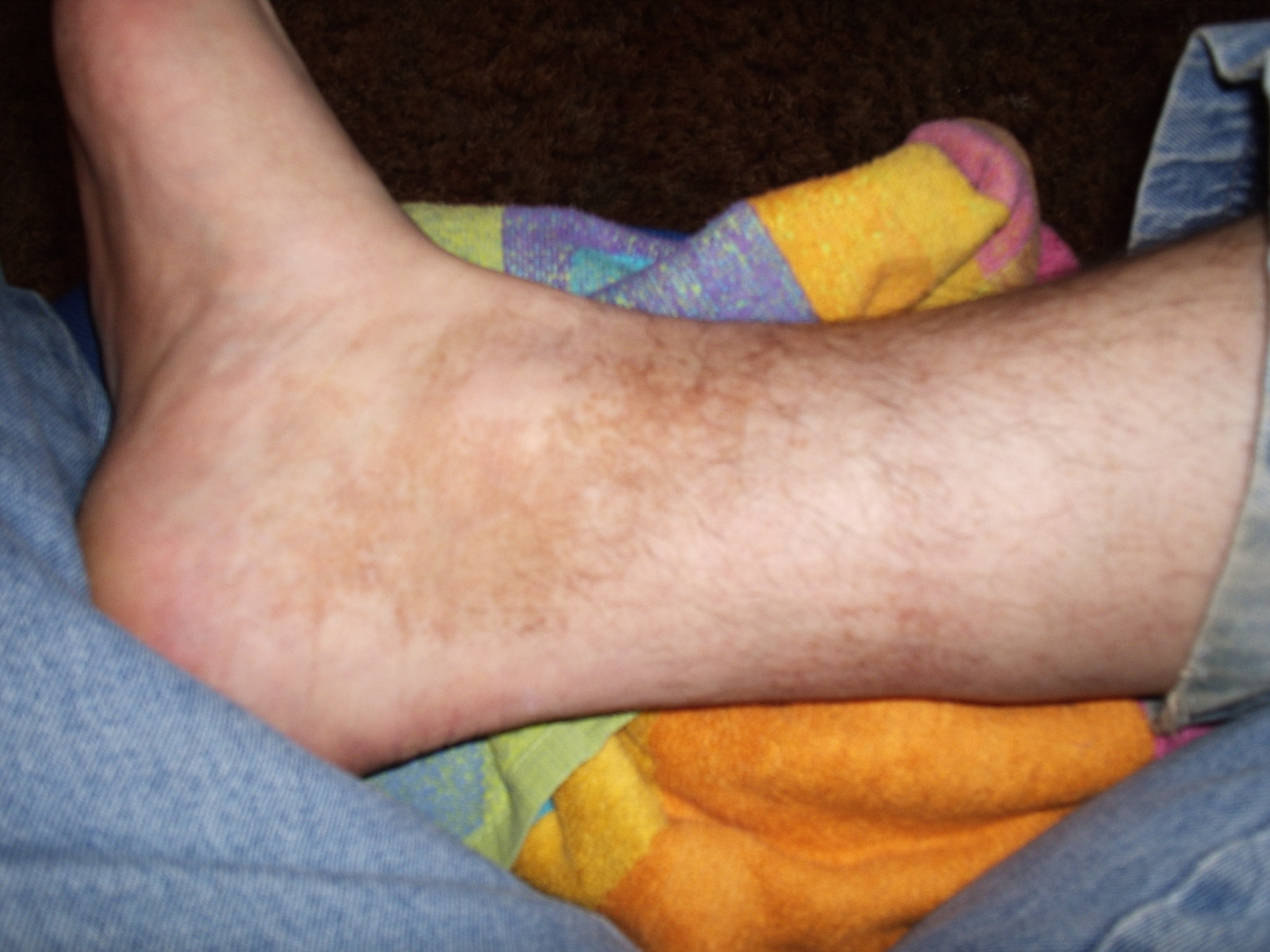
- Hemosiderin staining around and above the ankle as an outcome of chronic hypertension.
- Specialty: Dermatology

Hemosiderin hyperpigmentation is pigmentation due to deposits of hemosiderin, and occurs in purpura, haemochromatosis, hemorrhagic diseases, and stasis dermatitis.

== See also ==
- List of cutaneous conditions
