= Ambulatory phlebectomy =

Treatment for varicose veins

- Specialty: Surgery, vascular surgery, vascular medicine, interventional radiology, dermatology

An ambulatory phlebectomy is a surgical phlebectomy treatment for superficial varicose veins and tributaries.

== Indications ==
General accepted indications for this technique are side branch varicose veins (semicirculatory varicose veins), varicose veins of the foot, around the ankle and the knee pit. It has been successfully used in arm varicosities and peri-ocular veins (around the eyes).

== Technique ==
The procedure involves the removal of the varicose veins through multiple small 2–3 mm incisions in the skin overlying the varicose veins. First the veins are marked with the patient in standing position. Then the patient is positioned on the operating table and local anesthesia is applied. Incisions are made using a surgical blade. The most important instrument for this technique is the vein retractor or phlebectomy hook. There are two ways by which the veins can be grasped. Into the vein itself with a sharp instrument or around the vein with a blunt instrument. The phlebectomy hook is inserted through an incision and the varicose veins is hooked, extracted, and subsequently fixed with a clamp (e.g. Mosquito clamp). Next the vein is pulled out by turning or "wenching" the exteriorized part of the vein and moving the clamps as the vein is pulled out further. Dependent on the amount of varicose vein that has been removed the next incision is made 5 to 10 cm. along the pre-operative markings.

== Results ==
The procedure may be performed with tumescent or local anesthesia, such as with lidocaine. It is called ambulatory phlebectomy because patients usually return to normal daily activity immediately after the procedure which therefore may be performed in hospital or outpatient settings. Ambulatory phlebectomy is considered to be more effective than sclerotherapy.

== Post-operative care ==
Graded compression stockings are usually worn for 1–2 weeks after the procedure but compression bandages may also be used. This procedure is often used as an adjunct to endovenous laser treatment or other endovenous ablations of the greater saphenous vein.

== Complications ==
Complications are uncommon, but include paresthesia, bruising, hemorrhage and hematoma.

== History ==
This technique has been attributed to Dr Robert Muller, a Swiss dermatologist who started experimenting with this technique in the mid-1950s because he was unsatisfied with the results of sclerotherapy. Moreover, he wanted an alternative for the large eyecatching scars patients were left with after classical varicose vein surgery. After ten years of experience he demonstrated this technique during the annual meeting of the French Phlebology Society.
