= CHIVA method =

Varicose vein surgery procedure

- Specialty: Phlebology

CHIVA method is a type of surgery used to treat varicose veins that occur as a result of long term venous insufficiency. The term is a French acronym for Conservatrice Hémodynamique de l'Insuffisance Veineuse en Ambulatoire (ambulatory conservative hemodynamic treatment venous insufficiency).

The method is based on the assumption that the symptoms of varicose veins are mainly the expression of an hemodynamic circulatory disorder, induced by various venous system malfunctions. CHIVA attempts to improve symptoms and signs without destroying the veins which remain available for vascular by pass.

A very detailed free PDF document on the principles of the CHIVA method is available online : Venous insufficiency of the pelvis and lower limbs

== Procedure ==
CHIVA involves Doppler ultrasonography to assess the hemodynamics. Specifically the ultrasound study is to figure out where in the venous system the reflux begins.

Then an operation is performed under local anesthesia, consisting of a few incisions and tying off of veins (usually one to four), without venous ablation. The ties are placed according to the ultrasound mapping. Areas where the veins are varicose may also be removed.

== Clinical trials ==
One study found that with CHIVA, recurrences was 18% rather than 35% with high ligation and stripping after 10 years follow-up. Patient symptoms at 10 years, however, did not differ.

The CHIVA and the stripping methods are equivalent regarding recurrence of varicose veins, but the CHIVA method may slightly reduce nerve injury and hematoma. The CHIVA method is also equivalent to either radio frequency ablation or endovenous laser therapy regarding recurrence and side effects.

But a subsequently published network meta-analysis of 39 RCTs on 6917 limbs showed the greatest long-term efficacy of the method, as well as the lowest recurrence rate.
