= Stasis dermatitis =

Skin changes in the leg due to blood pooling

- Other names: congestion eczema, gravitational dermatitis, gravitational eczema, stasis eczema, varicose eczema
- Specialty: Dermatology

Stasis dermatitis refers to the skin changes that occur in the leg as a result of "stasis" or blood pooling from insufficient venous return; the alternative name of varicose eczema comes from a common cause of this being varicose veins.

Insufficient venous return results in increased pressure in the capillaries with the result that both fluid and cells may "leak" out of the capillaries. This results in red cells breaking down, with iron-containing hemosiderin possibly contributing to the pathology of this entity.

== Symptoms ==
Stasis dermatitis may be characterized by:

- Skin that appears thin, brown, and tissue-like, with possible skin lesions (macule or patches), red spots, superficial skin irritation, and/or darkening and/or thickening of the skin at the ankles or legs
- Weak skin may ulcerate in some areas, and legs, ankles, or other areas may become swollen
- Open sores, ulcers
- Itching and/or leg pains
- Sometimes pain may persist from swollen tissues and may feel like "stabbing" or "needle pricks"

If skin continues to deteriorate and breaks down, a venous ulcer (also known as a stasis ulcer) may form. Without proper wound care, open cracks predispose patients for the entry of a bacterial infection, causing cellulitis in the leg.

== Diagnosis ==
Stasis dermatitis is diagnosed clinically by assessing the appearance of red plaques on the lower legs and the inner side of the ankle. Stasis dermatitis can resemble several other conditions, such as cellulitis and contact dermatitis, and at times needs the use of a duplex ultrasound to confirm the diagnosis or if clinical diagnosis alone is not sufficient.

== Treatment ==
Treatment may consist of topical applications of steroid-based creams and the use of compression stockings or intermittent pneumatic compression pumps, to help force the underlying buildup of fluids back out of the lower leg.

Compression therapy should consist of moderate pressures and work best for ambulating patients.

Ultimately, treating the underlying venous reflux is necessary to treat Stasis dermatitis. Invasive surgical procedures like saphenofemoral junction ligation with stripping were the norm for treatment in the past. However, less invasive methods are now more widely used. These newer methods include endovenous thermal ablation, ambulatory phlebectomy, and ultrasound foam sclerotherapy.

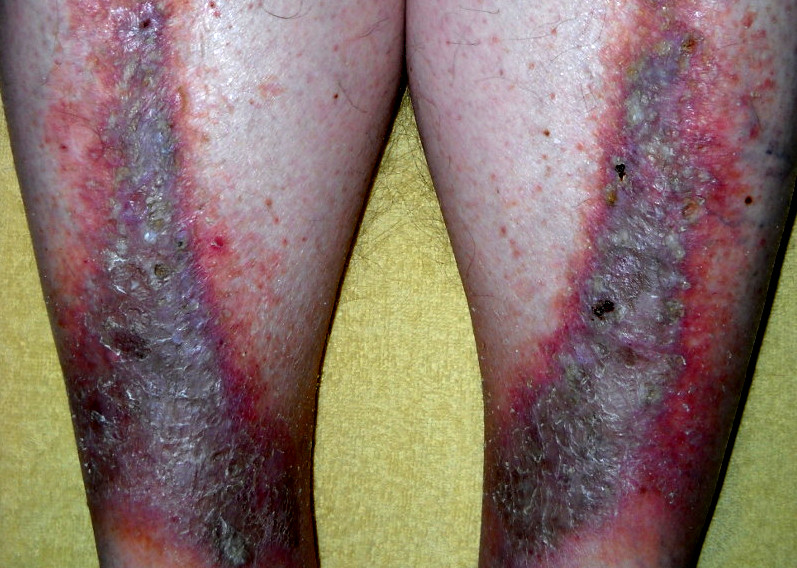
Stasis dermatitis (Gravitational eczema)

== Complications ==
If stasis dermatitis goes untreated, the patient is at risk of developing venous ulcers and Acroangiodermatitis.

== See also ==
- Sinus pericranii
- List of cutaneous conditions
