= Barr v. Nicholson =

United States veterans claims case

Barr vs. Nicholson
- Court: United States Court of Appeals for Veterans Claims
- Decided: June 15, 2007
- Citation: 21 Vet. App. 303 (2007)

Case history
- Appealed from: Board of Veterans Appeals

Court membership
- Judges sitting: Greene (Chief Judge), Kasold (Associate Judge), Hagel (Associate Judge)

Barr vs. Nicholson is a United States Court of Appeals for Veterans Claims case that dealt with the competence of a Veteran's lay testimony to provide lay evidence. The court held that lay evidence can be competent depending on the type of disability claimed by a claimant. Specifically, the court held that lay people are competent to identify varicose veins that are "unnaturally distended or abnormally swollen and tortuous."

== Background ==
Veteran James Barr appealed a Board of Veterans' Appeals (BVA) decision denying service connection for varicose veins. In October 1996, he filed a claim for service connection for varicose veins. He claimed at the time that the condition was due to physical training in service. He also provided lay testimony that he had been treated at a field hospital in service and that he received private treatment since separation from service in 1967. A January 1997 VA examination diagnosed the Veteran with varicose veins and venous insufficiency of the legs. There was no medical opinion provided regarding etiology. The VA Regional Office denied the claim and the Veteran filed a Notice of Disagreement.

In December 1997, the Veteran provided a statement that his condition started in 1966 but only started causing him pain 30 years after service. He also stated that in his unit there were medical professionals that looked at his condition but did not feel that surgical intervention was required. During a hearing he also reported seeing several private physicians that he had seen since discharge from service, to whom he had mentioned his varicosities.

BVA denied the decision, finding that the preponderance of the evidence was against the claim. In its denial, BVA stated that there was no competent evidence to confirm that the varicose veins were due to service. The Board also stated that the Veteran was a layman and therefore was not competent to confirm a medical diagnosis or provide causation.

== Analysis and decision ==
The Court first acknowledged that generally a lay person is not competent to opine as to medical etiology or render medical opinions. The Court, however, pointed out that a lay person is competent to observe symptomatology and identify medical conditions in certain circumstances. In the present case, the Court held that the Veteran was able to identify varicose veins that are "unnaturally distended or abnormally swollen and tortuous." The Court explained that because varicose veins may be diagnosed by their unique and readily identifiable features, determining the presence of varicose veins is not "medical in nature" and can be made through lay observation. Essentially, competency in this regard depends on the disability claimed.

The Court vacated and remanded the Board decision for further adjudication.
