= Compression stockings =

Compression garment

Compression stockings
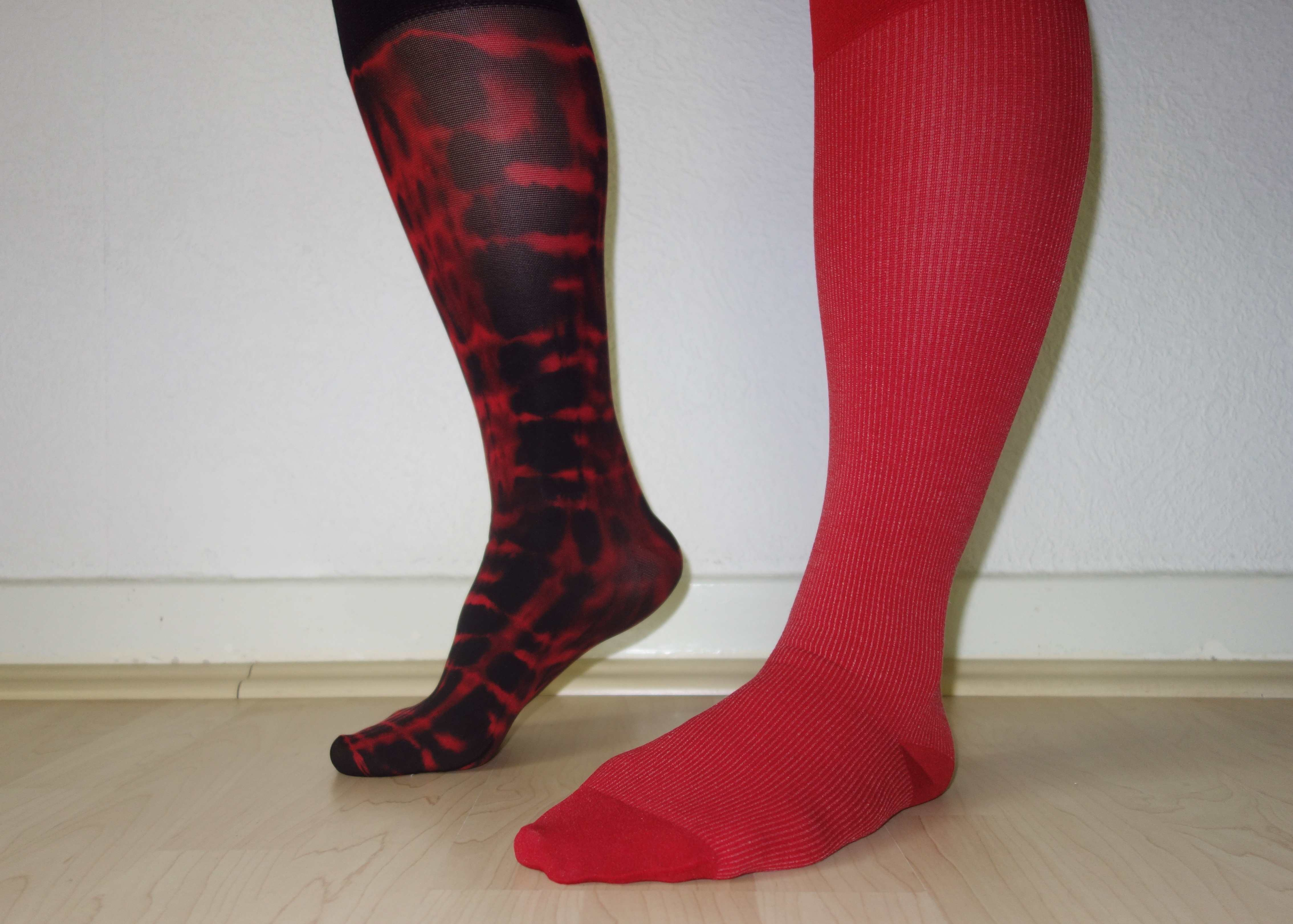
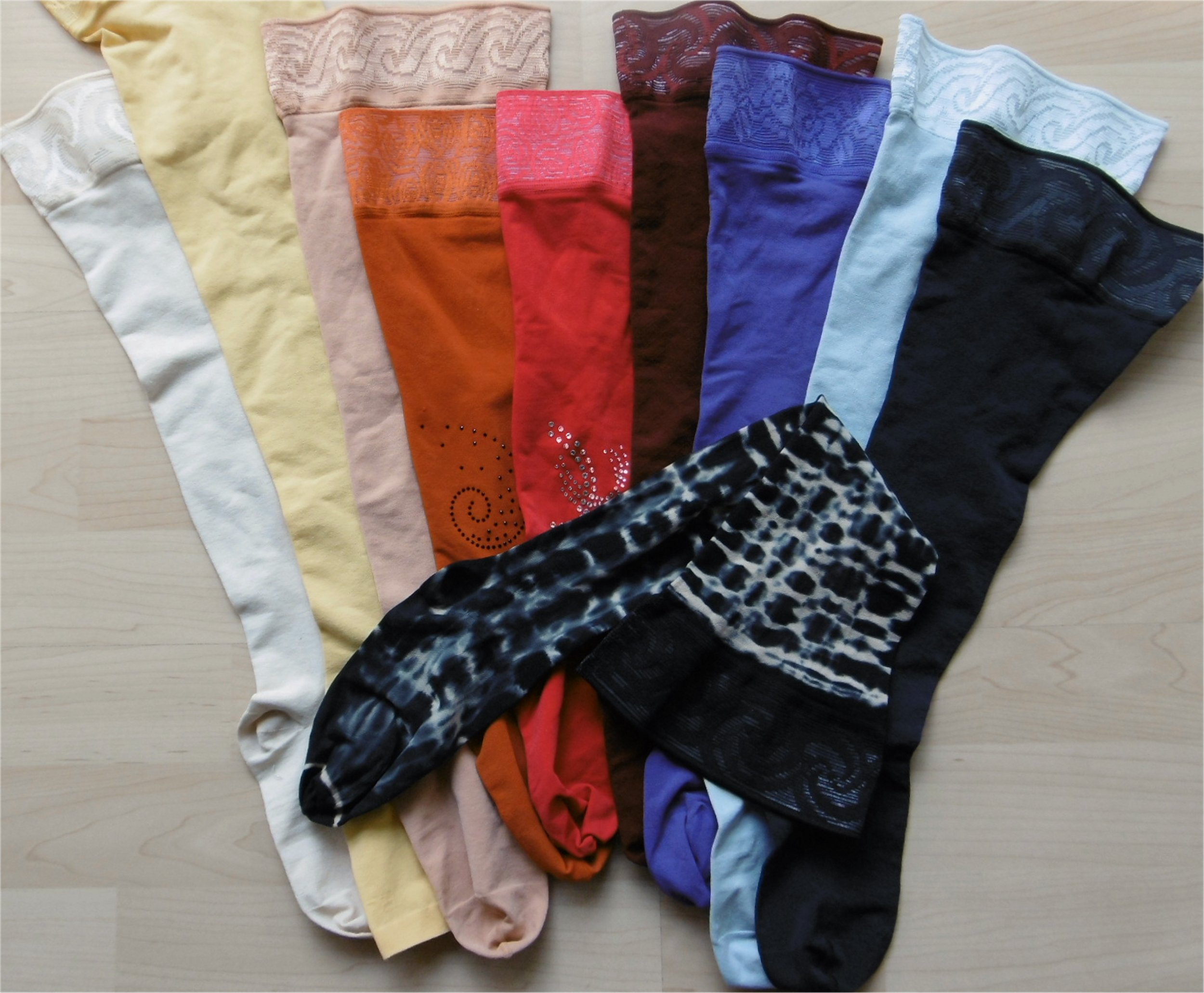

Compression stockings are a specialized hosiery designed to help prevent the occurrence of, and guard against further progression of, venous disorders such as edema, phlebitis and thrombosis. Compression stockings are elastic compression garments worn around the leg, compressing the limb. This reduces the diameter of distended veins and increases venous blood flow velocity and valve effectiveness. Compression therapy helps decrease venous pressure, prevents venous stasis and impairments of venous walls, and relieves heavy and aching legs.

Knee-high compression stockings are used not only to help increase circulation, but also to help prevent the formation of blood clots in the lower legs. They also aid in the treatment of ulcers of the lower legs.

Unlike traditional dress or athletic stockings and socks, compression stockings use stronger elastics to create significant pressure on the legs, ankles and feet. Compression stockings are tightest at the ankles and gradually become less constrictive toward the knees and thighs. By compressing the surface veins, arteries and muscles, they force circulating blood through narrower channels. As a result, the arterial pressure is increased, which causes more blood to return to the heart and less blood to pool in the feet.

There are two types of compression stockings, gradient and anti-embolism.

== Medical uses ==
Treatment is usually prescribed by a physician to relieve all manifestations of chronic venous disease and prevent venous troubles. The use of elastic compression stockings can reduce volumetric variations during standing hours. Compression stockings are recommended under the following conditions:

=== Edema ===
Edema is a condition where the opposing forces that occur in the small blood vessels and capillaries cause a net ultrafiltration of plasma water into the soft tissues.

=== Chronic venous insufficiency ===
Chronic peripheral venous insufficiency is when the veins cannot pump deoxygenated blood back to the heart.

=== Varicose veins ===
Varicose veins

Varicose veins are saccular and distended veins which can expand considerably and may cause painful venous inflammation. Once developed, they will not disappear on their own. The formation of varicose veins is an externally visible sign of venous weakness.

Many physicians and vein specialists recommend wearing compression stockings after varicose vein stripping, but studies show that wearing an elastic compression stocking has no additional benefit after the application of elastic bandaging for three days in post-operative care following the stripping of the great saphenous vein as assessed by control of limb, edema, pain, complications and return to work.

=== Deep vein thrombosis ===
Deep vein thrombosis (DVT) occurs when blood flow decreases (especially in the lower extremities), causing blood to pool in the legs and leading to blood clot (thrombus) formation. Evidence does not suggest a benefit in post-thrombotic syndrome rates following DVT. Compression stockings are beneficial in reducing symptomless deep vein thrombosis among airline passengers flying for 7 hours or more.

Pharmacological (warfarin, heparin, low-molecular-weight heparin) and mechanical measures (graded compression stockings, intermittent pneumatic compression devices, and venous foot pumps) are used to prevent venous thromboembolism (VTE) in clinical practice. For cases in which the bleeding risk is high and pharmacologic measures are contraindicated, the use of mechanical prophylaxis is recommended. Graduated compression stockings can effectively prevent VTE in hospitalized patients by applying different pressure to the leg. The meta-analysis of general surgical patients revealed that graduated compression stockings decreased their risk of developing VTE by 68% compared to placebo.

Twenty randomized controlled trials analyzed the effectiveness of graduated compression stockings alone or with other additional prophylaxis in prevention of deep vein thrombosis. These trials included 1,681 patients after general surgery, orthopedic surgery, and medical patients. They concluded that graduated compression stockings are effective in deep vein thrombosis prophylaxis in patients who have undergone general and orthopedic surgery.

Combining graduated compression stockings with other mechanical and pharmacological measures can increase the effectiveness of VTE prophylaxis by 60%. However, another study performed in France involved 407 ICU patients and showed no difference in the effectiveness of the VTE prevention for patients who used compression stockings alone or in combination with intermittent pneumatic devices.

=== Lymphedema ===
Lymphedema occurs when a body part swells due to an abnormal accumulation of lymph fluid, occurring when there is interference with the normal drainage of lymph fluid back into the blood, commonly swelling the arm, leg, neck or abdomen.

=== Phlebitis ===
Phlebitis is the term used when inflammation and clotting occurs in a vein, most often a leg vein, due to infection, inflammation, or trauma. People with varicose veins are more often affected. Inflammation occurs suddenly, causing the thrombus to adhere firmly to the vein wall and risking clogging a superficial vein.

=== Lipodermatosclerosis ===
Lipodermatosclerosis is the term used to refer to the inflammation of subcutaneous fat, a form of panniculitis.

=== Pregnancy ===
Hormones released during pregnancy and the expanding uterus (pressure on the inferior vena cava – the major vein returning blood up to the heart) can affect leg veins.

=== Postural orthostatic tachycardia syndrome (POTS) ===
The use of lower leg compression stockings has been found to reduce symptoms and heart rate when standing upright, in patients with postural orthostatic tachycardia syndrome. Usage of compression garments on abdomen and thighs, and a combination of abdominal/thigh and leg covering compression was found to be more effective, with the latter having the most beneficial outcome.

== Contraindications ==
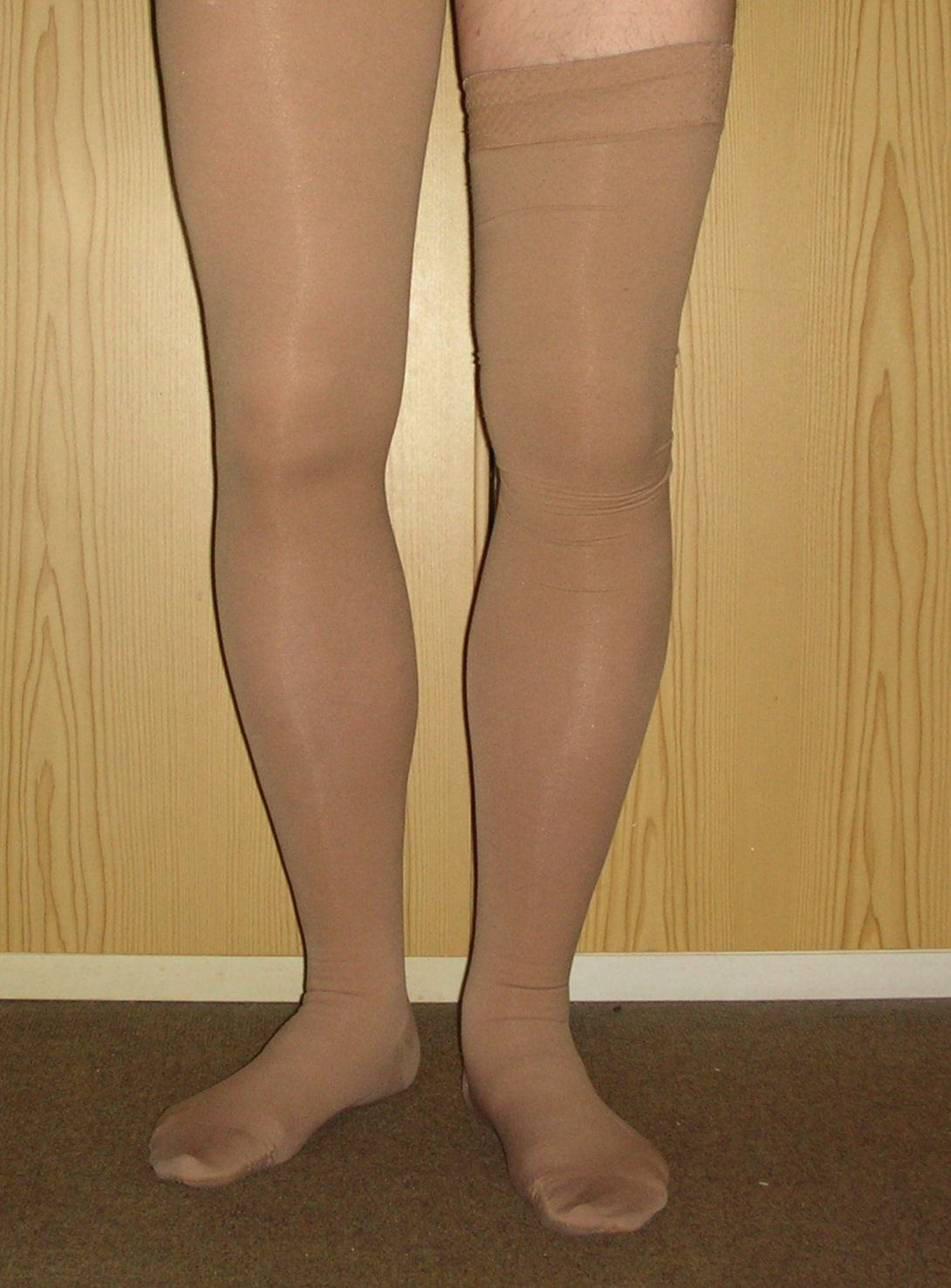
Compression stockings

Caution should be used in those with advanced peripheral obstructive arterial disease, heart failure, septic phlebitis, oozing dermatitis and advanced peripheral neuropathy in regard to wearing compression stockings.

== Procedure ==
=== Sizing ===
First the proper size stocking is determined by measuring the legs. Aseptic technique (antiseptic wound cleaning) is not necessary unless the skin is broken. The person is placed in the supine position (lying down) in bed for fifteen minutes prior to measuring for fit. This allows for venous return and stability before measuring.

=== Application procedure ===
Stockings are best applied upon waking before the person has gotten out of bed, has been sitting or standing and before venous stasis or edema has had a chance to develop. The use of stockings for the entire day is more effective than just half the day.

Fit is critical to the therapeutic effect of compression stockings. A study listed in the American Journal of Nursing in August 2008 showed that compression stockings were incorrectly sized in just under 30% of the cases studied. It found that additional education was needed not only for patients, but also for medical staff.

=== Gradient ===
These stockings are designed to remedy impaired "musculovenous pump" performance caused by incompetent leg vein valves. They are woven in such a way that the compression level is highest around the ankle and lessens towards the top of the hose.

Doctors will typically recommend these stockings for those who are prone to blood clots, lower limb edema, and blood pooling in the legs and feet from prolonged periods of sitting or inactivity. They are also frequently used to address complications caused by diabetes, lymphedema, thrombosis, cellulitis, and other conditions.

They are worn by those who are ambulatory in most cases, helping calf muscles to perform their pumping action more efficiently to return blood to the heart. In some cases, they are worn by those at increased risk of circulatory problems, such as diabetics, whose legs are prone to excessive swelling. A common indicator for the prescription of such stockings is chronic peripheral venous insufficiency, caused by incompetent perforator veins. Low-pressure compression stockings are available without prescription in most countries, and may be purchased at a pharmacy or medical supply store.

There are several crucial cautionary steps that need to be taken before using compression stockings:

1. A patient's ankle–brachial pressure index (ABPI) must be >1.0 per leg to wear compression stockings, otherwise the stockings may obstruct the patient's arterial flow. The ABPI indicates how unobstructed a patient's leg and arm arteries are. Any competent doctor or nurse can measure and calculate a patient's ABPI.
2. It is crucial that compression stockings are properly sized. The compression should gradually reduce from the highest compression at the smallest part of the ankle, until a 70% reduction of pressure just below the knee.

Vascular doctors and nurses may use special pads to ensure uniform higher pressure around the circumference of the ankle (to smooth out the irregular cross-sectional profile.) Self-prescription is reasonably safe assuming that the compression gradient is 15–20 mmHg, the ABPI (for both legs) is >1.0 and that the stockings fit correctly. "Firm" gradient stockings (20–30 mmHg and 30–40 mmHg) should generally be worn only on medical advice.

Current research reports mixed results of compression socks on athletic performance.

=== Knee-high versus thigh-high ===
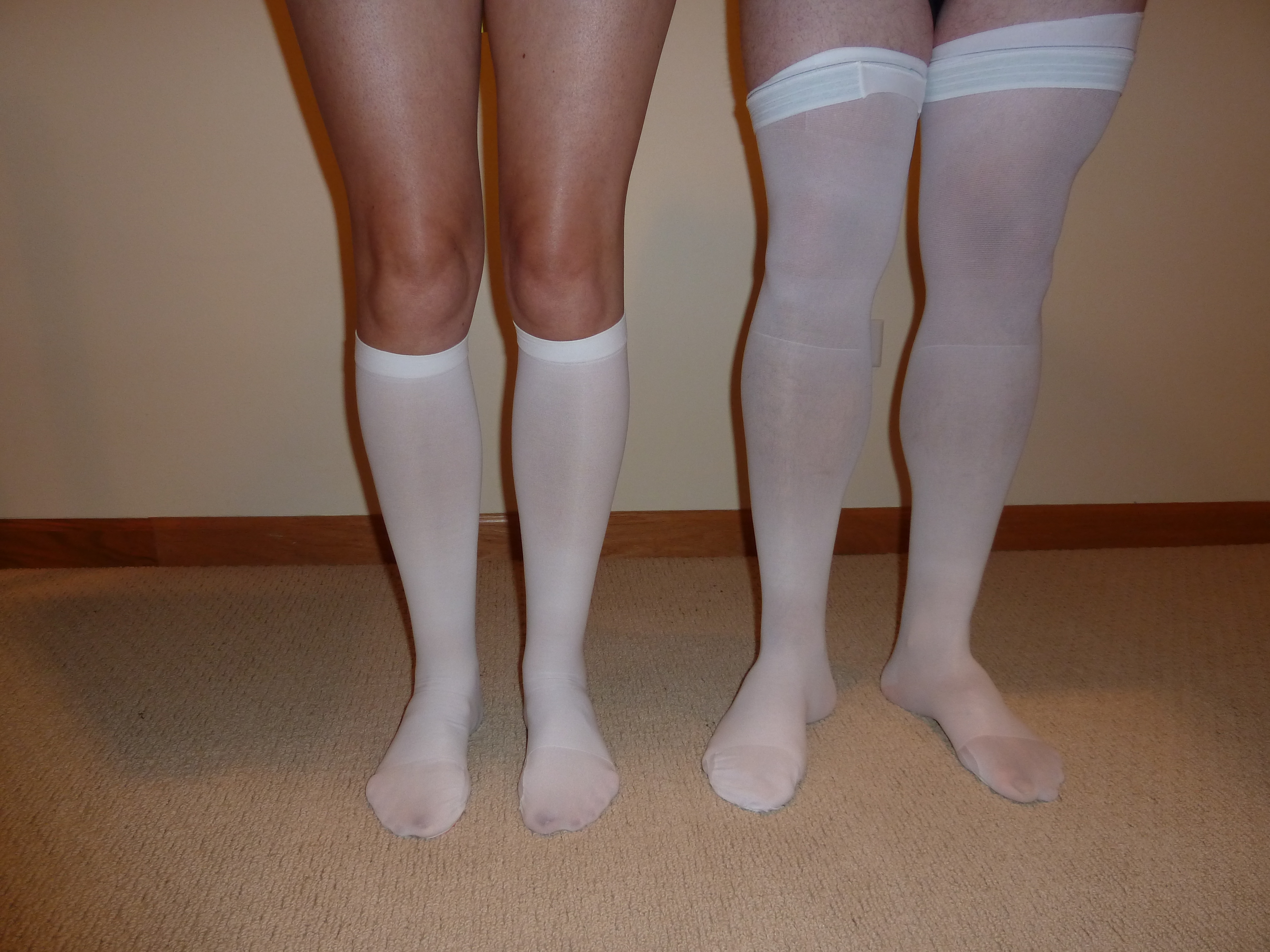
Knee-high and thigh-high anti-embolism compression stockings

The graduated (gradient, graded) compression stockings and anti-embolism compression stockings come in knee-high and thigh-high length. A meta-analysis by Sajid et al. was done to compare knee-high and thigh-high graded compression stockings in regards of deep vein thrombosis prevention in medical and surgical patients. The analysis determined that there was a 6% risk of developing deep vein thrombosis when wearing knee-high stockings and 4% when wearing thigh-high stockings, but also found significant heterogeneity, and thus it concluded that there is not enough evidence that one length is superior to the other, and suggests that knee-high compression stockings should be the first choice for the deep vein thrombosis prevention in medical and surgical patients.

Knee-high stockings are more comfortable, easier to apply, and wearing them increases patients' compliance with treatment. Knee-high stockings are easier to size for limb measurement than thigh-high compression stockings. Thigh-high compression stockings may create a tourniquet effect and cause localized restriction when rolled down. A study of patients treated for post-thrombotic syndrome, performed in Italy, revealed that redness and itching of the skin was reported in 41% of patients wearing thigh-high and 27% in patients wearing knee-high compression stockings. Consequently, 22% of thigh-high wearers and 14% of knee-high wearers stopped the treatment.

=== Compression classes ===
Compression stockings are constructed using elastic fibers or rubber. These fibers help compress the limb, aiding in circulation.

Compression stockings are offered in different levels of compression. The unit of measure used to classify the pressure of the stockings is mmHg. They are often sold in a variety of pressure ranges.

== History ==
Use of compression therapy is not new. As early as the Neolithic period (5000–2500 BCE), images of soldiers with bandaged lower extremities were found in the drawings of the caves of Tassili in Sahara. The Edwin Smith Papyrus, which dates to roughly 1600 BCE, included additional evidence of mechanical compression therapy for legs. Hippocrates treated his patients' leg ulcers with tight bandages, which were described in his Corpus Hippocraticum (450–350 BCE). Galen (130–200 CE) used wool and linen compression bandages to prevent blood from pooling in the legs, and Oribassius (324 CE) would use tight bandages to treat leg ulcers.

During the Middle Ages, the leading use of leg compression bandages was mainly for therapy. This is evidenced by the works of Avicenna (980–1037); Giovanni Michele Savonarola (1384–1468); Ambroise Paré (1510–1590); Girolamo Fabrizio di Acquapendente (1537–1619); and other scientists. Guy de Chauliac in his book Chirurgica Magna described the use of compression bandages to treat enlarged veins of the legs. Giovanni Michele Savonarola also treated varicose veins with the help of the leg bandages and described their proper application in his work Practice.

In 1628, William Harvey discovered the link between venous stasis and the external pressure. Following that discovery, various compression measures were introduced for therapy: laced stockings, elastic bands, and tight bandages with resin. Later, new textile materials started to be used for the production of compression stockings: natural or cellulose fibers (silk, cotton, coconut) and chemical (acrylic, nylon, polyester). It was only at the end of the 19th century, after Fischer and Lasker, German phlebologists, discovered that the application of the external pressure helped to treat blood clots in the lower extremities, that compression stockings started to be used for the treatment of deep vein thrombosis.

== Terminology ==
=== Commonly used terms ===
Anti-embolism
Worn by non-ambulatory or post-surgical patients to help prevent pooling of blood in the legs that could lead to a venous thrombosis.
Custom
Made for a specific individual.
Circular knit
Seamless stockings that offer greater aesthetic appeal.
Flat knit
Stockings made with a seam that can be constructed in virtually any shape or size. Most often used in higher compression classes.
Silver
Stockings constructed using special silver textile fibers. Silver has an anti-microbial effect, helping to reduce odor.
Lymphedema
Stockings used to manage edema resulting from the onset of lymphedema.
Support
Mild compression stockings sold over-the-counter and without a physician's prescription.

These stockings are commonly referred to as TED hose, short for thromboembolism-deterrent hose. They are used to support the venous and lymphatic drainage of the leg.

== Styles ==
- Knee-high compression
- Thigh-high (AG)
- Pantyhose (AT)
- Maternity pantyhose
- Waist attachment/CHAPS

== See also ==
- Compression sportswear, which compress to aid athletes
- Diabetic socks, which prevent compression
- Great saphenous vein
- Military anti-shock trousers
- Small saphenous vein
