= Endovenous laser treatment =

Laser technique used for treating varicose veins

Endovenous laser treatment (ELT) is a minimally invasive ultrasound-guided technique used for treating varicose veins using laser energy commonly performed by a phlebologist, interventional radiologist or vascular surgeon.

== Methods ==
Endovenous laser treatment treats varicose veins using an optical fiber that is inserted into the vein to be treated, and laser light, normally in the infrared portion of the spectrum, shines into the interior of the vein. This causes the vein to contract, and the optical fiber is slowly withdrawn. Some minor complications can occur, including thrombophlebitis, pain, hematoma, edema and infection, which can lead to cellulitis.

EVLT has the same meaning as ELT, but it is a trademark name owned by Diomed and used as the name for their 910 nm laser treatment unit for ELT. The 810 nm laser is the original laser fiber wavelength as pioneered by Dr. Luis Navarro, Dr. Carlos Bone and Dr. Robert Min, at the Vein Treatment Center in New York, New York. Subsequently, various other fibers with different wavelengths have become available. The varying wavelength each aim to maximize local damage to a component of the varicose vein or the blood contained in it while minimizing damage to adjacent tissues.

During the procedure, a catheter bearing a laser fiber is inserted under ultrasound guidance into the great saphenous vein (GSV) or small saphenous vein (SSV) through a small puncture. The catheter is then advanced, also under ultrasound guidance, to the level of the groin or knee crease. Dilute local anesthesia is injected around and along the vein (perivascular infiltration) using ultrasound imaging to place the local anesthetic solution around the vein, mostly in a sub-facial location. This technique derives from the tumescent local anesthesia (TLA) method long used and proven safe and effective for some methods of liposuction. The laser is activated whilst the catheter or laser fiber is slowly withdrawn, resulting in obliteration of the saphenous vein along its entire length. The treatment, which is performed without sedation, usually takes between 1 and two hours, and the patient walks out under his or her own power. The leg is bandaged and/or placed in a stocking that the patient wears for up to three weeks afterwards.

Foam sclerotherapy or ambulatory phlebectomy is often performed at the time of the procedure or within the first 1–2 weeks to treat branch varicose veins. However, some physicians do not perform these procedures at the time of the ELT because the varicose veins can improve on their own as a result of reduced reflux from the great saphenous vein.

== Complications ==
Complications of endovenous laser treatment can be categorized as minor, or serious. Minor complications include bruising (51%), hematoma (2.3%), temporary numbness (3.8%), phlebitis (7.4%), induration (46.7%), and a sensation of tightness (24.8%). More serious complications include skin burns (0.5%), deep venous thrombosis (0.4%), pulmonary embolism (0.1%), and nerve injury (0.8%). These rates of complications are derived from the Australian MSAC review of all available literature on the procedure. Retinal damage is a serious but very rare complication (<1%) that can occur during the use of lasers. If the fiber breaks or if the laser is activated when the laser is outside of the body, reflected laser light may cause a focal permanent retinal deficit or "blind spot" or scotoma. The nominal hazard zone (NHZ) or space within which the level of direct, scattered, or reflected laser radiation exceeds the maximum permissible exposure (MPE), varies by the wavelength of the laser and is shorter (17 inches) with the newer 1470 nm laser. Use of appropriate protective eyeware specific to the wavelength laser being used prevents accidental injury.

== Clinical evaluations ==
A 2005 report from one practice, summarising results of 1,000 limbs treated over a 5-year period with EVLT showed that 98% of the treated vessels at up to 60 months follow-up remained closed, with complications and side effects such as temporary paresthesia and DVTs below 0.5%.

The Australian Medical Services Advisory Committee (MSAC) in 2008 has determined that endovenous laser treatment for varicose veins "appears to be more effective in the short term, and at least as effective overall, as the comparative procedure of junction ligation and vein stripping for the treatment of varicose veins." It also found in its assessment of available literature, that "occurrence rates of more severe complications such as DVT, nerve injury and paresthesia, post-operative infections and hematomas, appears to be greater after ligation and stripping than after EVLT". A study of 516 treated veins over 69 months by Elmore and Lackey reported a success rate of 98.1%.

Endovenous thermal ablation (EVTA) by radiofrequency or laser is a safe and effective treatment of refluxing great saphenous veins (GSVs) and has replaced traditional high ligation and stripping in official recommendations of various leading Vascular Societies in the United States and the United Kingdom.

== Postoperative instructions ==
Patients are usually fitted with Class 3 (30-40mmHg) graduated compression stockings and/or bandages for up to 12 hours weeks. Duplex ultrasound is used during follow-up to assess the success of treatment, if there is a need for additional sclerotherapy or any deep vein thrombosis that has formed as an EHIT secondary to procedure.

== See also ==
- Interventional radiology
