= Varicose veins =

Medical condition in which superficial veins become large and twisted

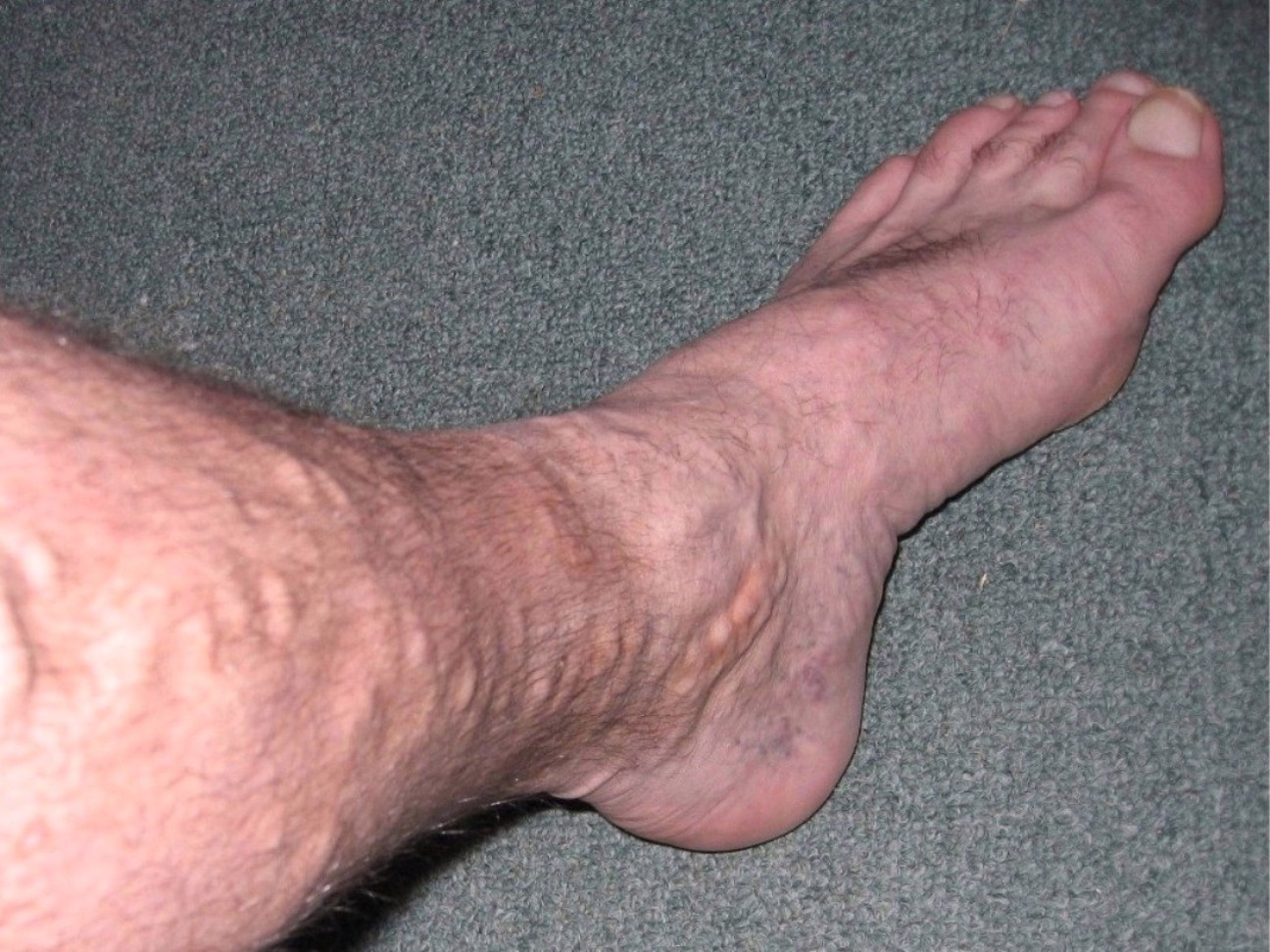
- Left leg of a male affected by varicose veins
- Pronunciation: /ˈværɪkoʊs/
- Specialty: Vascular surgery, dermatology
- Symptoms: None, fullness, pain in the area
- Complications: Bleeding, superficial thrombophlebitis
- Risk factors: Obesity, not enough exercise, leg trauma, family history, pregnancy
- Diagnostic method: Based on examination
- Differential diagnosis: Arterial insufficiency, peripheral neuritis
- Treatment: Compression stockings, exercise, sclerotherapy, surgery, endovenous ablation
- Prognosis: Commonly reoccur
- Frequency: Very common

Varicose veins are a medical condition in which superficial veins become enlarged and twisted. Although usually just a cosmetic ailment, in some cases they cause fatigue, pain, itching, and nighttime leg cramps. These veins typically develop in the legs, just under the skin. Their complications can include bleeding, skin ulcers, and superficial thrombophlebitis. Varices in the scrotum are known as varicocele, while those around the anus are known as hemorrhoids. The physical, social, and psychological effects of varicose veins can lower their bearers' quality of life.

Varicose veins have no specific cause. Risk factors include obesity, lack of exercise, leg trauma, and family history of the condition. They also develop more commonly during pregnancy. Occasionally, they result from chronic venous insufficiency. Underlying causes include weak or damaged valves in the veins. They are typically diagnosed by examination, including observation by ultrasound.

By contrast, spider veins affect the capillaries and are smaller.

Treatment may involve lifestyle changes or medical procedures with the goal of improving symptoms and appearance. Lifestyle changes may include wearing compression stockings, exercising, elevating the legs, and weight loss. Possible medical procedures include sclerotherapy, laser surgery, and vein stripping. However, recurrence is common following treatment.

Varicose veins are very common, affecting about 30% of people at some point in their lives. They become more common with age. Women develop varicose veins about twice as often as men. Varicose veins have been described throughout history and have been treated with surgery since at least the second century BC, when Plutarch tells of such treatment performed on the Roman leader Gaius Marius.

== Signs and symptoms ==
Veins that are "unnaturally distended or abnormally swollen and tortuous" may be noticed and reported as an aesthetic concern.

- Aching, heavy legs
- Appearance of spider veins (telangiectasia) in the affected leg
- Ankle swelling
- A brownish-yellow shiny skin discoloration near the affected veins
- Redness, dryness, and itchiness of areas of skin, termed stasis dermatitis or venous eczema
- Muscle cramps when making sudden movements, such as standing
- Abnormal bleeding or healing time for injuries in the affected area
- Lipodermatosclerosis or shrinking skin near the ankles
- Restless legs syndrome appears to be a common overlapping clinical syndrome in people with varicose veins and other chronic venous insufficiency
- Atrophie blanche, or white, scar-like formations
- Burning or throbbing sensation in the legs

People with varicose veins might have a positive D-dimer blood test result due to chronic low-level thrombosis within dilated veins (varices).

=== Complications ===
Most varicose veins are reasonably benign, but severe varicosities can lead to major complications, due to the poor circulation through the affected limb.

- Pain, tenderness, heaviness, inability to walk or stand for long hours
- Skin conditions / dermatitis which could predispose skin loss
- Skin ulcers especially near the ankle, usually referred to as venous ulcers
- Development of carcinoma or sarcoma in longstanding venous ulcers. Over 100 reported cases of malignant transformation have been reported at a rate reported as 0.4% to 1%
- Severe bleeding from minor trauma, of particular concern in the elderly
- Blood clotting within affected veins, termed superficial thrombophlebitis. These are frequently isolated to the superficial veins, but can extend into deep veins, becoming a more serious problem.
- Acute fat necrosis can occur, especially at the ankle of overweight people with varicose veins. Females have a higher tendency of being affected than males

== Causes ==
How a varicose vein forms in a leg. Figure A shows a normal vein with a working valve and normal blood flow. Figure B shows a varicose vein with a deformed valve, abnormal blood flow, and thin, stretched walls. The middle image shows where varicose veins might appear in a leg.

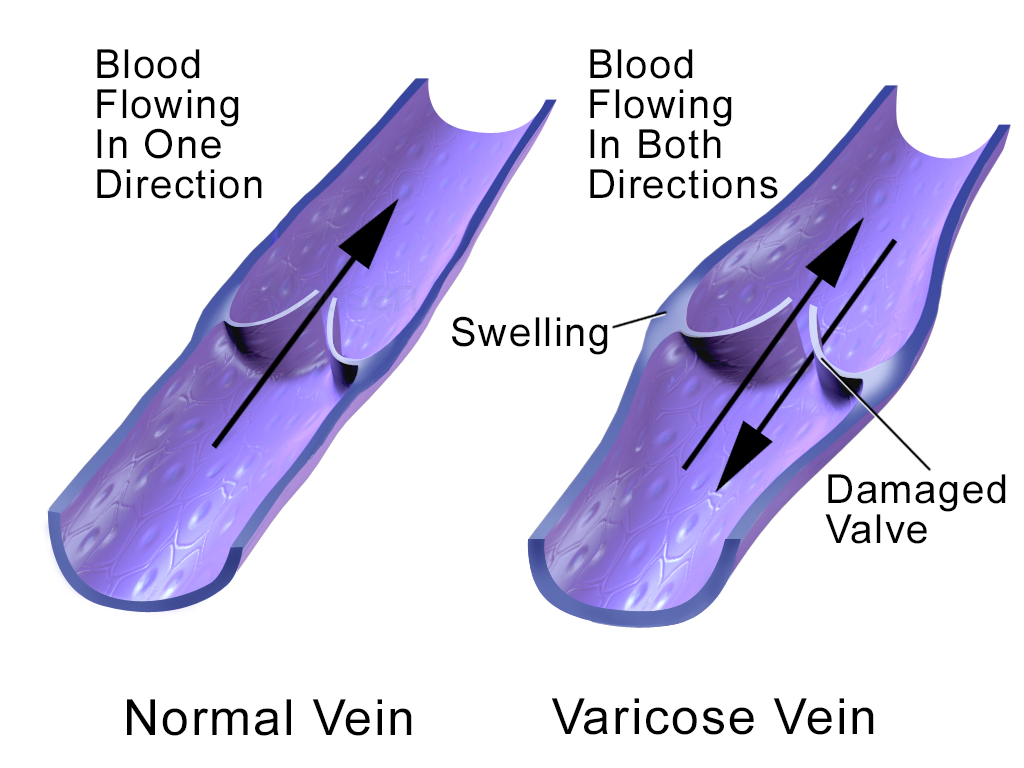
Comparison of healthy and varicose veins

Varicose veins are more common in women than in men and are linked with heredity. Other related factors are pregnancy, obesity, menopause, aging, prolonged standing, leg injury and abdominal straining. Varicose veins are unlikely to be caused by crossing the legs or ankles. Less commonly, but not exceptionally, varicose veins can be due to other causes, such as post-phlebitic obstruction or incontinence, venous and arteriovenous malformations.

Venous reflux is a significant cause. Research has also shown the importance of pelvic vein reflux (PVR) in the development of varicose veins. Varicose veins in the legs could be due to ovarian vein reflux. Both ovarian and internal iliac vein reflux causes leg varicose veins. This condition affects 14% of women with varicose veins or 20% of women who have had vaginal delivery and have leg varicose veins. In addition, evidence suggests that failing to look for and treat pelvic vein reflux can be a cause of recurrent varicose veins.

There is increasing evidence for the role of incompetent perforator veins (or "perforators") in the formation of varicose veins and recurrent varicose veins.

Varicose veins could also be caused by hyperhomocysteinemia in the body, which can degrade and inhibit the formation of the three main structural components of the artery: collagen, elastin and the proteoglycans. Homocysteine permanently degrades cysteine disulfide bridges and lysine amino acid residues in proteins, gradually affecting function and structure. Simply put, homocysteine is a 'corrosive' of long-living proteins, i.e. collagen or elastin, or lifelong proteins, i.e. fibrillin. These long-term effects are difficult to establish in clinical trials focusing on groups with existing artery decline. Klippel–Trenaunay syndrome and Parkes Weber syndrome are relevant for differential diagnosis.

Another cause is chronic alcohol consumption due to the vasodilatation side effect in relation to gravity and blood viscosity.

== Diagnosis ==
=== Clinical test ===
Clinical tests that may be used include:

- Trendelenburg test – to determine the site of venous reflux and the nature of the saphenofemoral junction

=== Investigations ===
Traditionally, varicose veins were investigated using imaging techniques only if there was a suspicion of deep venous insufficiency, if they were recurrent, or if they involved the saphenopopliteal junction. This practice is now less widely accepted. People with varicose veins should now be investigated using lower limbs venous ultrasonography. The results from a randomised controlled trial on patients with and without routine ultrasound have shown a significant difference in recurrence rate and reoperation rate at 2 and 7 years of follow-up.

=== Stages ===
The CEAP (Clinical, Etiological, Anatomical, and Pathophysiological) Classification, developed in 1994 by an international ad hoc committee of the American Venous Forum, outlines these stages

- C0 – Perthes test – no visible or palpable signs of venous disease
- C1 – telangectasia or reticular veins
- C2 – varicose veins
- C2r – recurrent varicose veins
- C3 – edema
- C4 – changes in skin and subcutaneous tissue due to Chronic Venous Disease
- C4a – pigmentation or eczema
- C4b – lipodermatosclerosis or atrophie blanche
- C4c – Corona phlebectatica
- C5 – healed venous ulcer
- C6 – active venous ulcer
- C6r – recurrent active ulcer

Each clinical class is further characterized by a subscript depending upon whether the patient is symptomatic (S) or asymptomatic (A), e.g. C2S.

== Treatment ==
Treatment can be either active or conservative.

=== Active ===
Treatment options include surgery, laser and radiofrequency ablation, and ultrasound-guided foam sclerotherapy. Newer treatments include cyanoacrylate glue, mechanochemical ablation, and endovenous steam ablation. No real difference could be found between the treatments, except that radiofrequency ablation could have a better long-term benefit.

=== Conservative ===
The National Institute for Health and Clinical Excellence (NICE) produced clinical guidelines in July 2013 recommending that all people with symptomatic varicose veins (C2S) and worse should be referred to a vascular service for treatment. Conservative treatments such as support stockings should not be used unless treatment was not possible.

The symptoms of varicose veins can be controlled to an extent with the following:

- Elevating the legs often provides temporary symptomatic relief.
- Advice about regular exercise sounds sensible but is not supported by any evidence.
- The wearing of graduated compression stockings with variable pressure gradients (Class II or III) has been shown to correct the swelling, increase nutritional exchange, and improve the microcirculation in legs affected by varicose veins. They also often provide relief from the discomfort associated with this disease. Caution should be exercised in their use in patients with concurrent peripheral arterial disease.
- The wearing of intermittent pneumatic compression devices has been shown to reduce swelling and pain.
- Diosmin/hesperidin and other flavonoids.
- Anti-inflammatory medication such as ibuprofen or aspirin can be used as part of treatment for superficial thrombophlebitis along with graduated compression hosiery – but there is a risk of intestinal bleeding. In extensive superficial thrombophlebitis, consideration should be given to anti-coagulation, thrombectomy, or sclerotherapy of the involved vein.
- Topical gel application helps in managing symptoms related to varicose veins such as inflammation, pain, swelling, itching, and dryness.

=== Procedures ===
==== Stripping ====
Stripping consists of removal of all or part the saphenous vein (great/long or lesser/short) main trunk. The complications include deep vein thrombosis (5.3%), pulmonary embolism (0.06%), and wound complications including infection (2.2%). There is evidence for the great saphenous vein regrowing after stripping. For traditional surgery, reported recurrence rates, which have been tracked for 10 years, range from 5% to 60%. In addition, since stripping removes the saphenous main trunks, they are no longer available for use as venous bypass grafts in the future (coronary or leg artery vital disease).

==== Other ====
Other surgical treatments are:

- CHIVA method (ambulatory conservative haemodynamic correction of venous insufficiency) is a relatively low-invasive surgical technique that incorporates venous hemodynamics and preserves the superficial venous system. The overall effectiveness compared to stripping, radiofrequency ablation treatment, or endovenous laser therapy is not clear and there is no strong evidence to suggest that CHIVA is superior to stripping, radiofrequency ablation, or endovenous laser therapy for recurrence of varicose veins. There is some low-certainty evidence that CHIVA may result in more bruising compared to radiofrequency ablation treatment.
- Vein ligation is done at the saphenofemoral junction after ligating the tributaries at the saphenofemoral junction without stripping the long saphenous vein, provided the perforator veins are competent and DVT is absent in the deep veins. With this method, the long saphenous vein is preserved.
- Cryosurgery – A cryoprobe is passed down the long saphenous vein following saphenofemoral ligation. The probe is then cooled with NO_{2} or CO_{2} to −85 °F. The vein freezes to the probe and can be retrogradely stripped after 5 seconds of freezing. It is a variant of stripping. The only purpose of this technique is to avoid a distal incision to remove the stripper.

==== Sclerotherapy ====
A commonly performed non-surgical treatment for varicose and "spider leg veins" is sclerotherapy, in which medicine called a sclerosant is injected into the veins to make them shrink. The medicines that are commonly used as sclerosants are polidocanol (POL branded Asclera in the United States, Aethoxysklerol in Australia), sodium tetradecyl sulphate (STS), Sclerodex (Canada), hypertonic saline, glycerin and chromated glycerin. STS (branded Fibrovein in Australia) liquids can be mixed at varying concentrations of sclerosant and varying sclerosant/gas proportions, with air or CO_{2} or O_{2} to create foams. Foams may allow more veins to be treated per session with comparable efficacy. Their use in contrast to liquid sclerosant is still somewhat controversial, and there is no clear evidence that foams are superior. Sclerotherapy has been used in the treatment of varicose veins for over 150 years. Sclerotherapy is often used for telangiectasias (spider veins) and varicose veins that persist or recur after vein stripping. Sclerotherapy can also be performed using foamed sclerosants under ultrasound guidance to treat larger varicose veins, including the great saphenous and small saphenous veins.

There is some evidence that sclerotherapy is a safe and possibly effective treatment option for improving the cosmetic appearance, reducing residual varicose veins, improving the quality of life, and reducing symptoms that may be present due to the varicose veins. There is also weak evidence that this treatment option may have a slightly higher risk of deep vein thrombosis. It is not known if sclerotherapy decreases the chance of varicose veins returning (recurrent varicose veins). It is also not known which type of substance (liquid or foam) used for the sclerotherapy procedure is more effective and comes with the lowest risk of complications.

Complications of sclerotherapy are rare, but can include blood clots and ulceration. Anaphylactic reactions are "extraordinarily rare but can be life-threatening," and doctors should have resuscitation equipment ready. There has been one reported case of stroke after ultrasound-guided sclerotherapy when an unusually large dose of sclerosant foam was injected.

==== Endovenous thermal ablation ====
Endovenous thermal ablation (EVTA) is a minimally invasive procedure used to treat varicose veins by delivering controlled heat inside the affected vein. The thermal energy damages the vein wall, causing it to shrink and triggering natural remodeling processes that lead to permanent closure of the vein. Unlike surgical stripping, the vein is not removed but remains in place and is gradually resorbed by the body over time. The procedure is usually performed under local tumescent anesthesia and is associated with less postoperative pain, fewer hematomas and nerve injuries, and generally faster recovery compared with open surgery. There are three main types of endovenous thermal ablation: laser (EVLA), radiofrequency (RFA), and steam ablation.

Early assessments, such as the Australian Medical Services Advisory Committee (MSAC) report in 2008, suggested that endovenous laser ablation (EVLA) was at least as effective overall as vein stripping and associated with fewer short-term complications, including deep vein thrombosis, nerve injury, postoperative infections, and hematomas. More recent systematic reviews and long-term studies confirm that EVLA and RFA have comparable long-term effectiveness to surgery, with differences mainly in recovery and early postoperative morbidity. In particular, EVLA and RFA are generally associated with shorter recovery times, earlier return to normal activities, and reduced early postoperative pain compared with surgical ligation and stripping. EVTA is considered by several international professional societies, including the Society for Vascular Surgery (SVS) and the European Society for Vascular Surgery (ESVS), as a first-line, less invasive alternative to traditional high ligation and vein stripping.

Steam ablation involves injecting pulses of steam into the affected vein, using water as the thermal agent. Clinical outcomes appear similar to those of EVLA or RFA, including vein closure rates and cosmetic results. However, steam treatment is currently rarely performed in routine clinical practice, because it is a newer technique with limited, smaller-scale studies compared with the well-established long-term data available for EVLA and RFA. Potential advantages include minimally invasive access, reduced postoperative pain, and rapid return to normal activities, but evidence remains limited compared with more established methods.

ELA and ERA require specialized training for doctors and special equipment. EVTA is performed as an outpatient procedure and does not require an operating theatre, nor does the patient need a general anaesthetic. Doctors use high-frequency ultrasound during the procedure to visualize the anatomical relationships between the saphenous structures.

Some practitioners also perform phlebectomy or ultrasound-guided sclerotherapy at the time of endovenous treatment. This is also known as an ambulatory phlebectomy. The distal veins are removed following the complete ablation of the proximal vein. This treatment is most commonly used for varicose veins off of the great saphenous vein, small saphenous vein, and pudendal veins. Follow-up treatment to smaller branch varicose veins is often needed in the weeks or months after the initial procedure.

==== Medical adhesive ====
Also called medical super glue, medical adhesive is an advanced non-surgical treatment for varicose veins during which a solution is injected into the diseased vein through a small catheter and under the assistance of ultrasound-guided imagery. The "super glue" solution is made of cyanoacrylate, aiming at sealing the vein and rerouting the blood flow to other healthy veins.

Post-treatment, the body will naturally absorb the treated vein which will disappear. Involving only a small incision and no hospital stay, medical super glue has generated great interest within the last years, with a success rate of about 96.8%.

A follow-up consultation is required after this treatment, just like any other one, in order to re-assess the diseased vein and further treat it if needed.

==== Echotherapy Treatment ====
In the field of varicose veins, the latest medical innovation is high-intensity focused ultrasound therapy (HIFU). This method is completely non-invasive and is not necessarily performed in an operating room, unlike existing techniques. This is because the procedure involves treating from outside the body, able to penetrate the skin without damage, to treat the veins in a targeted area. This leaves no scars and allows the patient to return to their daily life immediately.

== Epidemiology ==
Varicose veins are most common after age 50. It is more prevalent in females. There is a hereditary role. It has been seen in smokers, those who have chronic constipation, and in people with occupations which necessitate long periods of standing such as wait staff, nurses, conductors (musical and bus), stage actors, umpires (cricket, javelin, etc.), the King's guards, lectern orators, security guards, traffic police officers, vendors, surgeons, etc.
