= Post-thrombotic syndrome =

Residual symptoms following thrombosis (clots in the blood vessels)

- Other names: postphlebitic syndrome, venous stress disorder
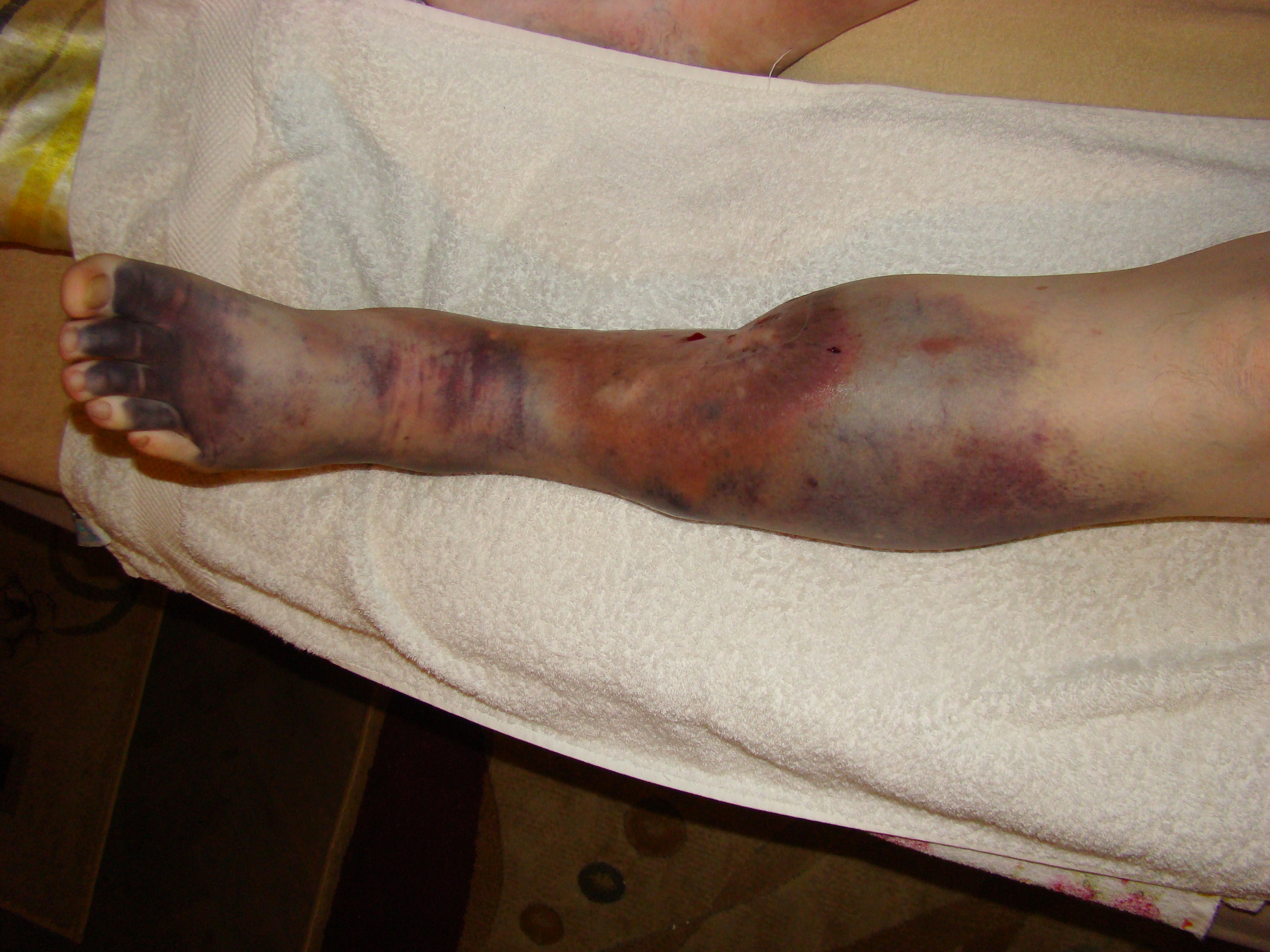
- Person with post-thrombotic syndrome and leg ulcers
- Specialty: Hematology

Post-thrombotic syndrome (PTS), also called postphlebitic syndrome and venous stress disorder is a medical condition that may occur as a long-term complication of deep vein thrombosis (DVT).

== Signs and symptoms ==
Signs and symptoms of PTS in the leg may include:

- pain (aching or cramping)
- heaviness
- itching or tingling
- swelling (edema)
- varicose veins
- brownish or reddish skin discoloration
- venous ulcer

These signs and symptoms may vary among patients and over time. With PTS, these symptoms typically are worse after walking or standing for long periods of time and improve with resting or elevating the leg.

PTS lowers a person's quality of life after DVT, specifically concerning physical and psychological symptoms and limitations in daily activities.

== Cause ==
Despite ongoing research, the cause of PTS is unclear. Inflammation is thought to play a role as well as damage to the venous valves from the thrombus itself. This valvular incompetence, combined with persistent venous obstruction from thrombus, increases the pressure in veins and capillaries. Venous hypertension induces a rupture of small superficial veins, subcutaneous hemorrhage and an increase of tissue permeability. That is manifested by pain, swelling, discoloration, and even ulceration.

== Risk factors ==
The following factors increase the risk of developing PTS:

- age > 65
- proximal DVT
- a second DVT in the same leg as the first DVT (recurrent ipsilateral DVT)
- persistent DVT symptoms 1 month after DVT diagnosis
- obesity
- poor quality of anticoagulation control (i.e., dose too low) during the first 3 months of treatment

== Diagnosis ==
When physicians find a DVT in the clinical history of their patients, a postthrombotic syndrome is possible if the patients have suggestive symptoms. Ultrasonography for deep venous thrombosis must be performed to evaluate the situation: the degree of obstruction by clots, the location of these clots, and the detection of deep and/or superficial venous insufficiency. Since signs and symptoms of DVT and PTS may be quite similar, a diagnosis of PTS should be delayed for 3–6 months after DVT diagnosis so an appropriate diagnosis can be made.

== Prevention ==
Prevention of PTS begins with the prevention of initial and recurrent DVT. For people hospitalized at high risk of DVT, prevention methods may include early ambulation, use of compression stockings or electrostimulation devices, and/or anticoagulant medications. Elastic compression stockings may reduce the occurrence of PTS after clinically confirmed DVT.

For people who have already had a single DVT event, the best way to prevent a second DVT is appropriate anticoagulation therapy.

A second prevention approach may be weight loss for those who are overweight or obese. Increased weight can put more stress and pressure on leg veins, and can predispose patients to developing PTS.

== Treatment ==
Treatment options for PTS include proper leg elevation, compression therapy with elastic stockings, or electrostimulation devices, pharmacotherapy (pentoxifylline), herbal remedies (such as horse chestnut, rutosides), and wound care for leg ulcers.

The benefits of compression bandages are unclear. They may be useful to treat edema.

=== Upper extremities ===
Patients with upper-extremity DVT may develop upper-extremity PTS. The incidence is lower than that for lower-extremity PTS (15–25%). No treatment or prevention methods are established, but patients with upper-extremity PTS may wear a compression sleeve for persistent symptoms.

== Epidemiology ==
PTS can affect 23 to 60% of patients in the two years following DVT of the leg. Of those, 10% may go on to develop severe PTS, involving venous ulcers.

== Society and culture ==
Treatment of PTS adds significantly to the cost of treating DVT. The annual health care cost of PTS in the United States has been estimated at $200 million, with costs over $3800 per patient in the first year alone, and increasing with disease severity. PTS also causes lost work productivity: people with severe PTS and venous ulcers lose up to 2 work days per year.

== Research directions ==
The field of PTS still holds many unanswered questions that are important targets for more research. Those include:

- Fully defining the pathophysiology of PTS, including the role of inflammation and residual thrombus after completion of an appropriate duration of anticoagulant therapy
- Developing a PTS risk prediction model
- Role of thrombolytic ("clot-busting") drugs in PTS prevention
- Defining the true efficacy of elastic compression stockings for PTS prevention (and if effective, elucidating the minimum compression strength necessary and the optimal timing and duration of compression therapy)
- Whether PTS prevention methods are necessary for patients with asymptomatic, or distal DVT
- Additional treatment options for PTS with demonstrated safety and efficacy (compression and pharmacologic therapies)
