= American Venous Forum =

American academic society for venous and lymphatic disease

The American Venous Forum (AVF) is the major national academic society focused on venous and lymphatic disease in the United States. Its mission includes education, research, and advocacy. The AVF is a sponsor organization for the Journal of Vascular Surgery Venous and Lymphatic and for the American Venous Forum meeting.

== History ==
Founded in 1987, the American Venous Forum (AVF) is dedicated to improving the care of patients with venous and lymphatic disease. The AVF fosters research and clinical innovation and educates health care professionals, patients and policy makers about venous and lymphatic diseases.

== Initiatives ==
=== Residents, Fellows and Early Career Education Series ===
This venous education series provides training and education within the specialties of vascular surgery, interventional radiology, interventional cardiology, vascular medicine, general surgery, and associated programs. These sessions are led by distinguished faculty and leaders in their respective fields and videos of past series can be found on the AVF website for future reference.

=== Venous guidelines ===
AVF has committees to create, critically analyze and revise, when necessary, various venous guidelines in the vascular society community. Some notable ones are listed below:

1. CEAP Classification System and Reporting Standards
2. Clinical Practice Guidelines on Lower Extremity Compression Therapy
3. Appropriate Use Criteria (AUC) for Chronic Lower Extremity Venous Disease
4. The 2022 Society for Vascular Surgery, American Venous Forum, and American Vein and Lymphatic Society clinical practice guidelines for the management of varicose veins of the lower extremities. Part I. Duplex Scanning and Treatment of Superficial Truncal Reflux
5. The 2023 Society for Vascular Surgery, American Venous Forum, and American Vein and Lymphatic Society clinical practice guidelines for the management of varicose veins of the lower extremities. Part II.

=== The Healthy Veins Book ===
The Healthy Veins Book:Understanding Varicose Veins and Leg Swelling is designed to assist vascular patients with terms, treatment options, and answers to frequently asked questions about venous diseases. This textbook provides essential information on the cause, presentation and up-to-date management of venous diseases. It also includes important data on prevention and treatment of blood clots, leg swelling, varicose veins and venous ulcers.

=== Vein specialist newsletter ===
AVF also provides a monthly newsletter via email that discusses upcoming or recent events the society has hosted or been involved with as well as noteworthy journal articles in the vascular field.

== Annual meeting ==
VENOUS2027, AVF's annual meeting, is an international, scientific, academic and practical meeting for vascular surgeons as well as other practitioners that treat venous and lymphatic disease around the world. It includes oral and poster presentations on research conducted in vascular surgery in the United States and around the world, as well as demonstrations from medical device companies and a keynote address from the president of the society. This 39th annual meeting will be held on February 27 - March 2, 2027 in Nashville, TN.

== Journal of Vascular Surgery Venous and Lymphatic ==
The AVF and Society of Vascular Surgery sponsor the Journal of Vascular Surgery Venous and Lymphatic, which is a peer-reviewed academic journal published by Elsevier that started in 2013. It has published several of the most notable academic papers in the field of venous and lymphatic disease. In 2021, the journal had an impact factor of 4.19, the highest among venous journals.
