= Lipodermatosclerosis =

Inflammation and stiffening of the underskin fat

- Other names: Chronic panniculitis with lipomembranous changes, hypodermitis sclerodermiformis, sclerosing panniculitis, stasis panniculitis
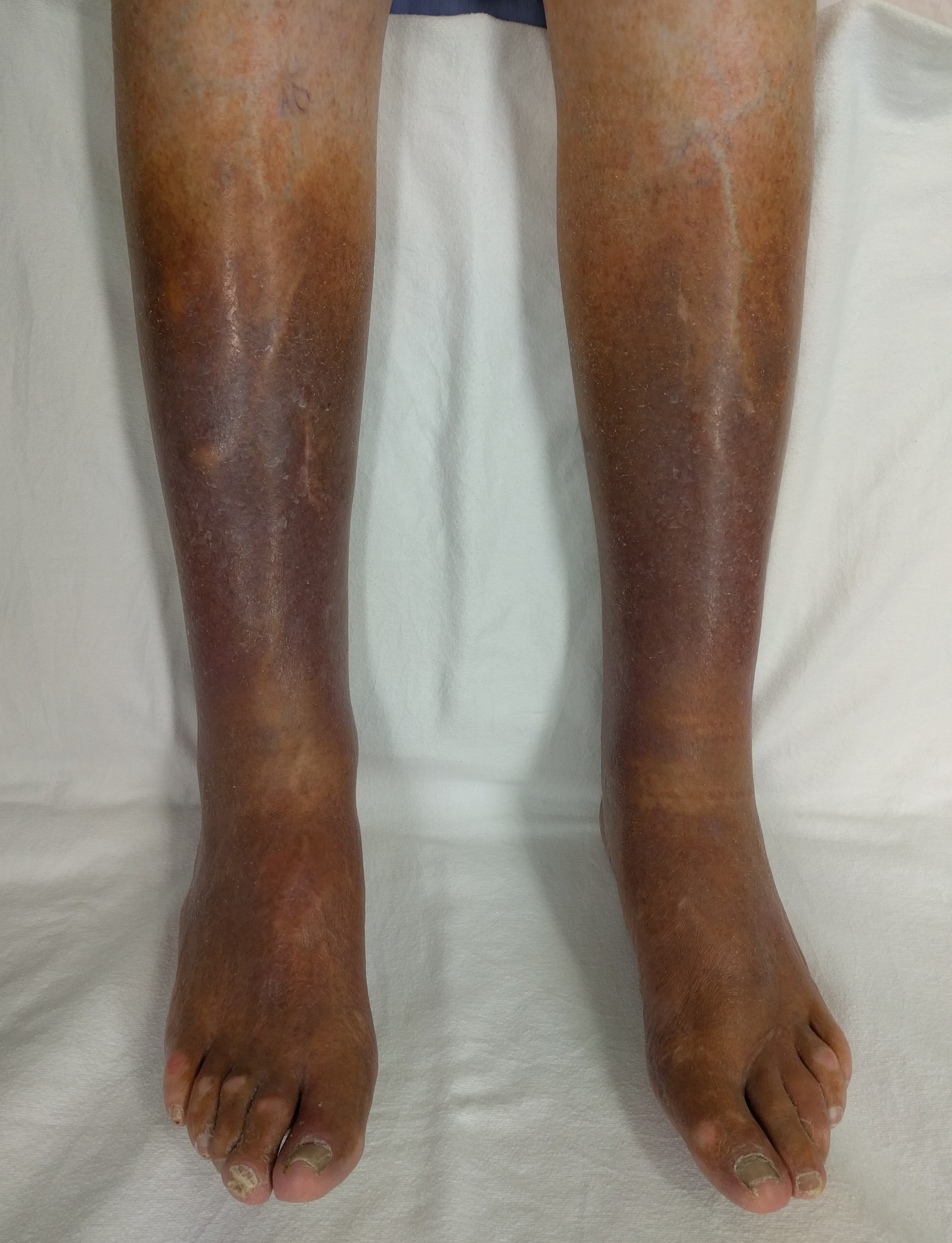
- Chronic venous insufficiency
- Specialty: Dermatology

Lipodermatosclerosis is a skin and connective tissue disease. It is a form of lower extremity panniculitis, an inflammation of the layer of fat under the epidermis.

== Signs and symptoms ==
Pain may be the first noticed symptom. People with lipodermatosclerosis have tapering of their legs above the ankles, forming a constricting band resembling an inverted champagne bottle. In addition, there may be brownish-red pigmentation and induration. Symptoms may also include swelling in feet and ankles, leathery skin, flaky skin, itchy skin, leg cramping, leg heaviness, leg swelling, leg tiredness, leg achiness, foot pain, slow healing wounds on legs and feet, bulging varicose veins, warmth in legs, redness in legs, and pain with prolonged standing.

== Causes ==
The exact cause of lipodermatosclerosis is unknown. Venous disease, such as venous incompetence, venous hypertension, and body mass (obesity) may be relevant to the underlying pathogenesis.

Increased blood pressure in the veins (venous hypertension) can cause diffusion of substances, including fibrin, out of capillaries. Fibrotic tissue may predispose the tissue to ulceration. Recurrent ulceration and fat necrosis is associated with lipodermatosclerosis. In advanced lipodermatosclerosis, the proximal leg swells from chronic venous obstruction, and the lower leg shrinks from chronic ulceration and fat necrosis, resulting in the inverted coke bottle appearance of the lower leg.

Lipodermatosclerosis is most commonly diagnosed in middle-aged women.

The origin of lipodermatosclerosis is probably multifactorial, involving tissue hypoxia, leakage of proteins into the interstitium, and leukocyte activation. Studies of patients with lipodermatosclerosis have demonstrated significantly decreased concentrations of cutaneous oxygen associated with decreased capillary density. Capillaries are virtually absent in areas of fibrotic scars, leading to a condition known as atrophie blanche or livedoid vasculopathy.

== Diagnosis ==
Diagnosis is clinical, based on observation. Biopsy is rarely required.

== Treatment ==
The management of lipodermatosclerosis may include treating venous insufficiency with leg elevation and elastic compression stockings. In some difficult cases, the condition may be improved with the additional use of the fibrinolytic agent, stanozol. Fibrinolytic agents use an enzymatic action to help dissolve blood clots. Stanozol is injected directly into the affected area. Venous Ablation has also been known to help circulation in patients. Lifestyle changes such as maintaining a healthy weight & diet, exercising regularly, avoiding prolonged sitting or standing, and elevating your legs can play a significant role in managing lipodermatosclerosis and reducing its symptoms.

== See also ==
- Panniculitis
- List of cutaneous conditions

== Notes ==
Note: This article contains material adapted from the public domain source "Lipodermatosclerosis: Questions and Answers", by the U.S federal government's Genetic and Rare Diseases Information Center
