= Phlebectomy =

Surgical procedure

Vein stripping
- ICD-9-CM: 38.5

A phlebectomy, or vein stripping, is a surgical procedure done under general or local anaesthetic to aid in the treatment of varicose veins and other manifestations of chronic venous disease. The vein "stripped" (pulled out from under the skin using minimal incisions) is usually the great saphenous vein. The surgery involves making incisions (usually the groin and medial thigh), followed by insertion of a special metal or plastic wire into the vein. The vein is attached to the wire and then pulled out from the body. The incisions are stitched up and pressure dressings are often applied to the area.

An overnight hospital stay is sometimes required, although some clinics may do it as a day surgery procedure. Patients may be advised to avoid physical activity for days or weeks. A pressure bandage, followed by elastic stockings, is a common recovery prescription.

== Complications ==
As with any surgery that requires anesthesia, patients might experience some complications.

Some risks include:

- Allergic reactions
- Post operative bleeding
- Deep vein thrombosis and pulmonary embolism
- Nerve injury leading to numbness or weakness in affected area
- Infection

== See also ==
- Alternative procedures to vein stripping
- Anesthesia
- Medicine
- Perioperative mortality
- Surgery
