= Great saphenous vein =

Superficial vein of the leg

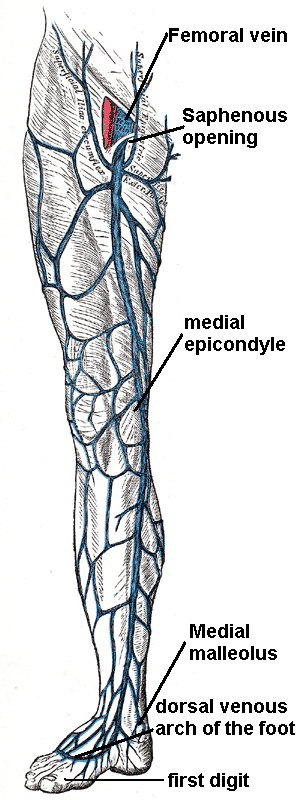
- The great saphenous vein and landmarks along its course from the dorsal venous arch to the saphenous opening and femoral vein

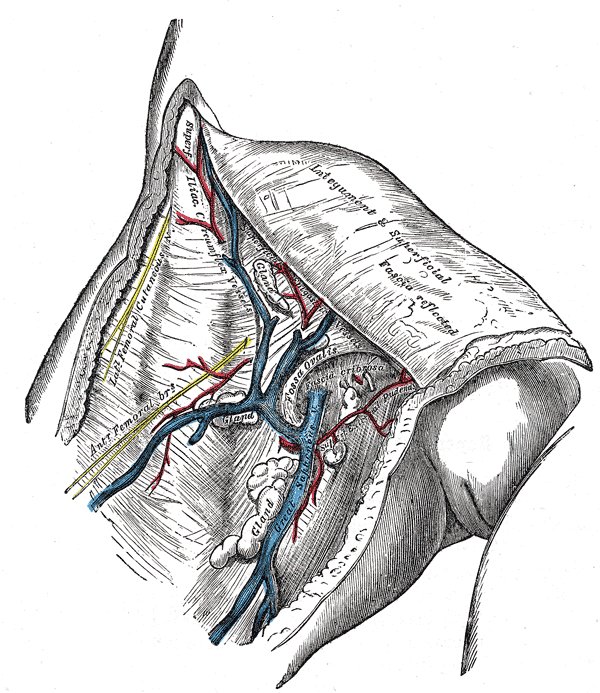
- The great saphenous vein and its tributaries at the fossa ovalis in the groin.

Details
- Source: Dorsal venous arch of the foot, and others
- Drains to: Femoral vein

Identifiers
- Latin: vena saphena magna
- TA98: A12.3.11.003
- TA2: 5058
- FMA: 21376

The great saphenous vein (GSV; /səˈfiːnəs/) or long saphenous vein is a large, subcutaneous, superficial vein of the leg. It is the longest vein in the body, running along the length of the lower limb, returning blood from the foot, leg, and thigh to the deep femoral vein at the femoral triangle.

== Structure ==
The great saphenous vein originates from where the dorsal vein of the big toe (the hallux) merges with the dorsal venous arch of the foot. After passing in front of the medial malleolus (where it often can be visualized and palpated), it runs up the medial side of the leg. At the knee, it runs over the posterior border of the medial epicondyle of the femur bone. In the proximal anterior thigh 3–4 centimetres (1.2–1.6 in) inferolateral to the pubic tubercle, the great saphenous vein dives down deep through the cribriform fascia of the saphenous opening to join the femoral vein. It forms an arch, the saphenous arch, to join the common femoral vein in the region of the femoral triangle at the sapheno-femoral junction.

=== Tributaries ===
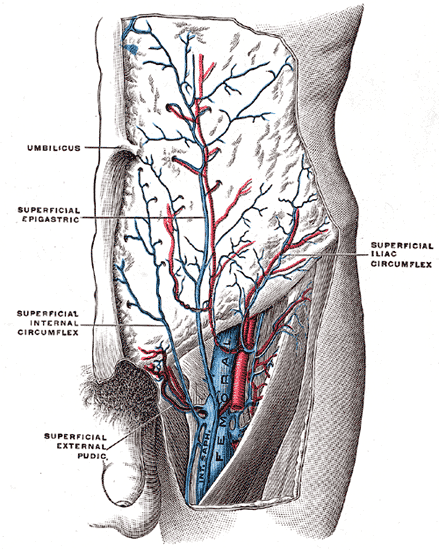
Superficial veins draining into the great saphenous and femoral vein.

Several veins join the great saphenous vein, but may not all present in every individual. Most of them join it near its junction with the common femoral vein (CFV), at various average distances from this junction:

Vein	Presence	Joins from direction	Joins at average distance from CFV junction
Superficial circumflex iliac vein	83%	Lateral	10.8 mm
Superficial epigastric vein	78%	Proximal	11.9 mm
Superficial external pudendal vein	90%	Medial	16.9 mm
Anterior accessory saphenous vein	51%	Lateral	20.5 mm
Posterior accessory saphenous vein			73.9 mm

At the ankle, the great saphenous vein receives branches from the sole of the foot through the medial marginal vein; in the lower leg it anastomoses freely with the small saphenous vein, communicates by perforator veins (Cockett perforators) with the anterior and posterior tibial veins and receives many cutaneous veins; near the knee it communicates with the popliteal vein by the Boyd perforator, in the thigh it communicates with the femoral vein by perforator veins (Dodd perforator) and receives numerous tributaries; those from the medial and posterior parts of the thigh frequently unite to form a large accessory saphenous vein which joins the main vein near the sapheno-femoral junction.

Near the fossa ovalis it is joined by the superficial epigastric, superficial circumflex iliac vein, and superficial external pudendal veins.

The thoracoepigastric vein runs along the lateral aspect of the trunk between the superficial epigastric vein below and the lateral thoracic vein above and establishes an important communication between the femoral vein and the axillary vein.

== Clinical significance ==
Pathology of the great saphenous vein is relatively common, but in isolation typically not life-threatening.

- Varicose veins: The great saphenous vein, like other superficial veins, can become varicose; swollen, twisted and lengthened, and generally considered to be unsightly. Varicose veins are not life-threatening and various treatment options are available. However, when the diameter of the vein is too large for the valves within it to coapt completely, the resulting condition, chronic venous insufficiency, can result in skin color changes in the calf and ulcers that may persist for years if the vein is not ablated.
- Thrombophlebitis: The GSV can thrombose. This type of phlebitis of the GSV is usually not life-threatening in isolation; however, if the blood clot is located near the sapheno-femoral junction or near a perforator vein, a clot fragment can migrate to the deep venous system and to the pulmonary circulation. Also it can be associated with, or progress to a deep vein thrombosis which must be treated promptly. So a GSV thrombosis is investigated by ultrasonography to detect if these complications are present.

=== Use in cardiovascular procedures ===
The vein is often removed (phlebectomy) by cardiac surgeons and used for autotransplantation in coronary artery bypass operations, when arterial grafts are not available or many grafts are required, such as in a triple bypass or quadruple bypass.

The great saphenous vein is the conduit of choice for vascular surgeons, when available, for performing peripheral arterial bypass operations. The saphenous vein may undergo vein graft failure after engraftment, but still it has superior long-term patency compared to synthetic grafts (PTFE, PETE (Dacron)), human umbilical vein grafts or biosynthetic grafts [Omniflow]. Often, it is used in situ (in place), after tying off smaller tributaries and destruction of the venous valves with a device called valvulotome, e.g. LeMaitre's valvulotome.

Removal of the saphenous vein will not materially hinder normal circulation in the leg. The blood that previously flowed through the saphenous vein will change its course of travel. This is known as collateral circulation.

The saphenous nerve that runs with the upper part of the great saphenous vein is a branch of the femoral nerve. It can be damaged in surgery on the vein.

=== Use in emergency medicine ===
When emergency resuscitation with fluids is necessary, and standard intravenous access cannot be achieved due to venous collapse, saphenous vein cutdown may be utilized.

== Etymology ==
The terms "saphaina" (Greek, meaning "manifest", "to be clearly seen") as well as "safin" (Arabic, "صَافِن" meaning "deep/embedded") have been claimed as the origin for the word "saphenous".

== Additional images ==
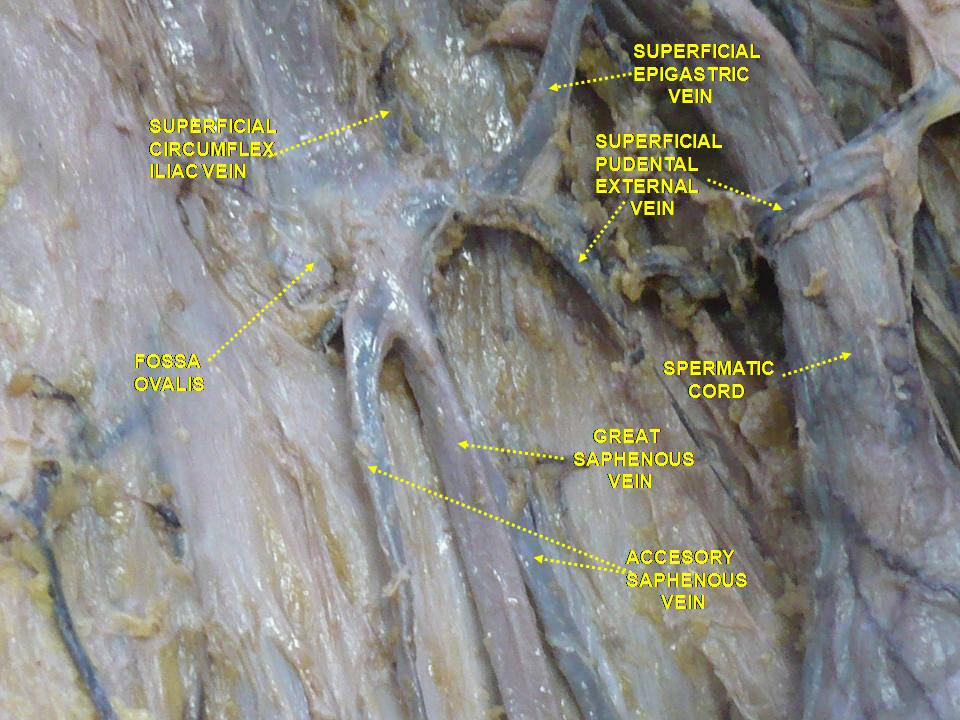
Superficial veins of lower limb. Superficial dissection. Anterior view.

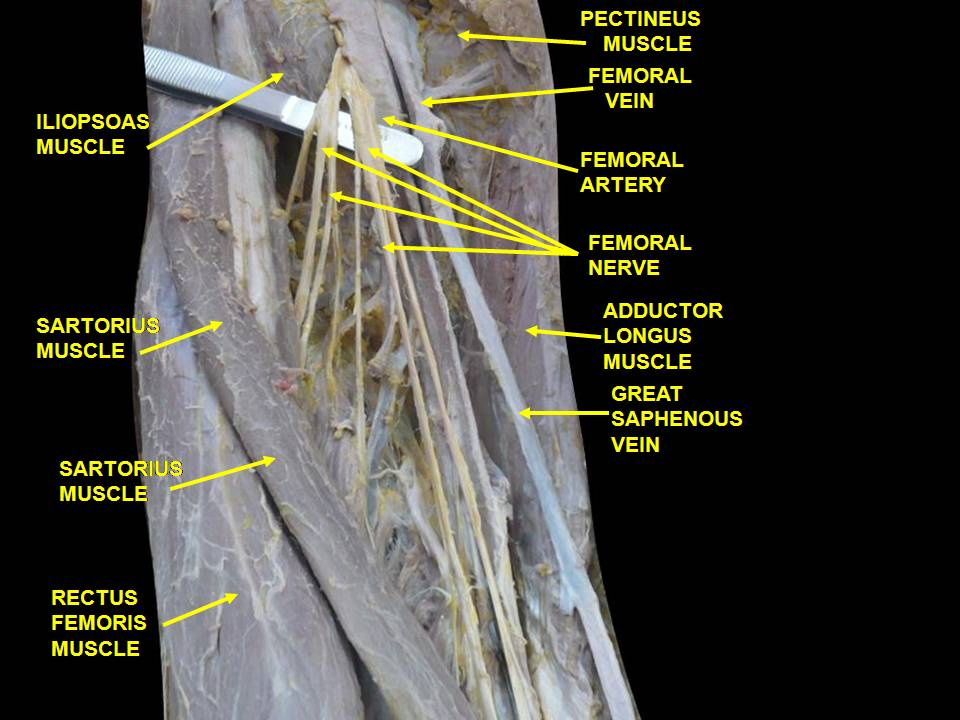
Great saphenous vein. Deep dissection. Anterior view.

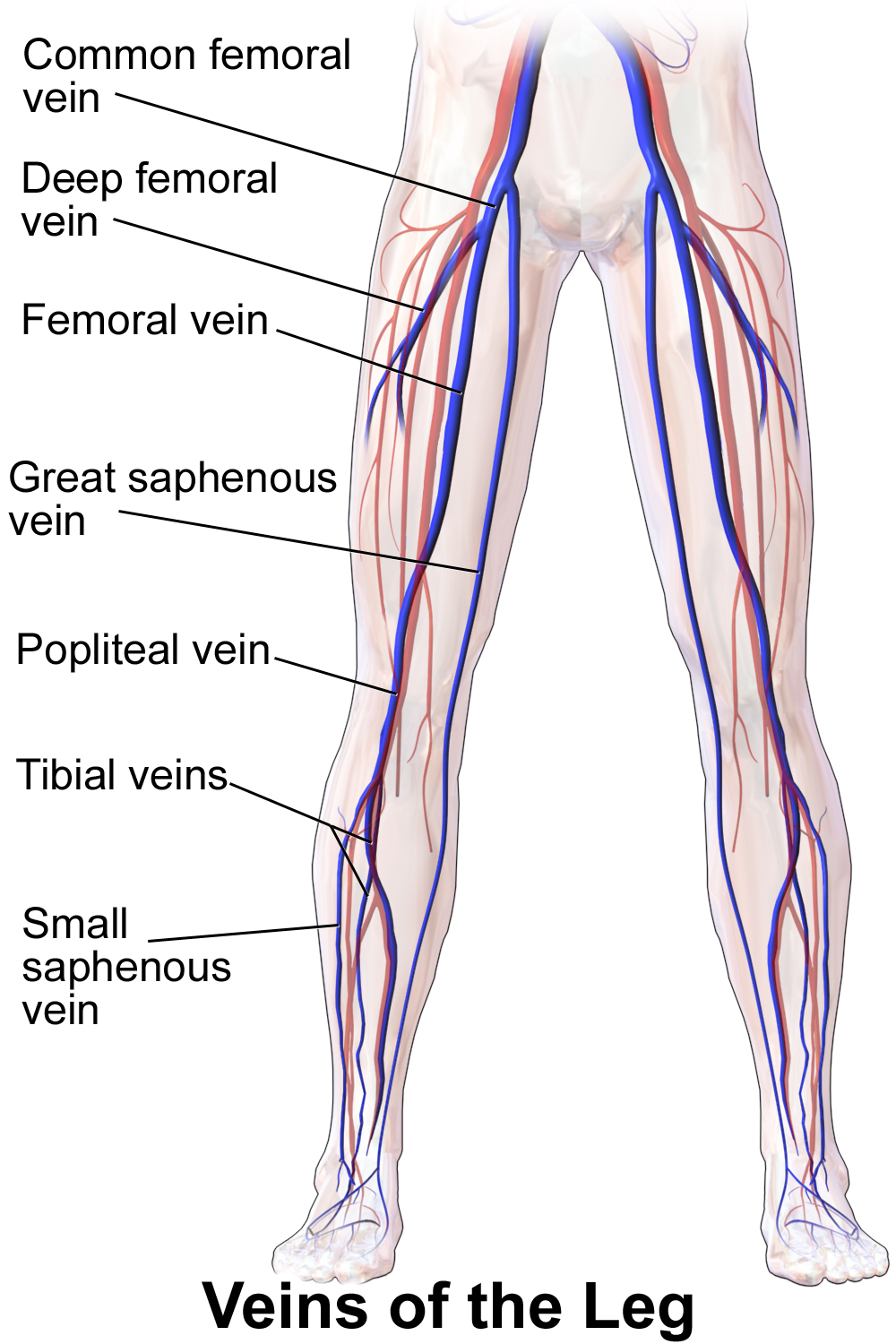
Illustration depicting veins of the leg including great saphenous vein (anterior view).

== See also ==
- Compression stockings
- Coronary artery bypass grafting (CABG)
- Saphena varix
- Small saphenous vein
- Varicose veins
