= Podoplanin =

Human protein

PDPN
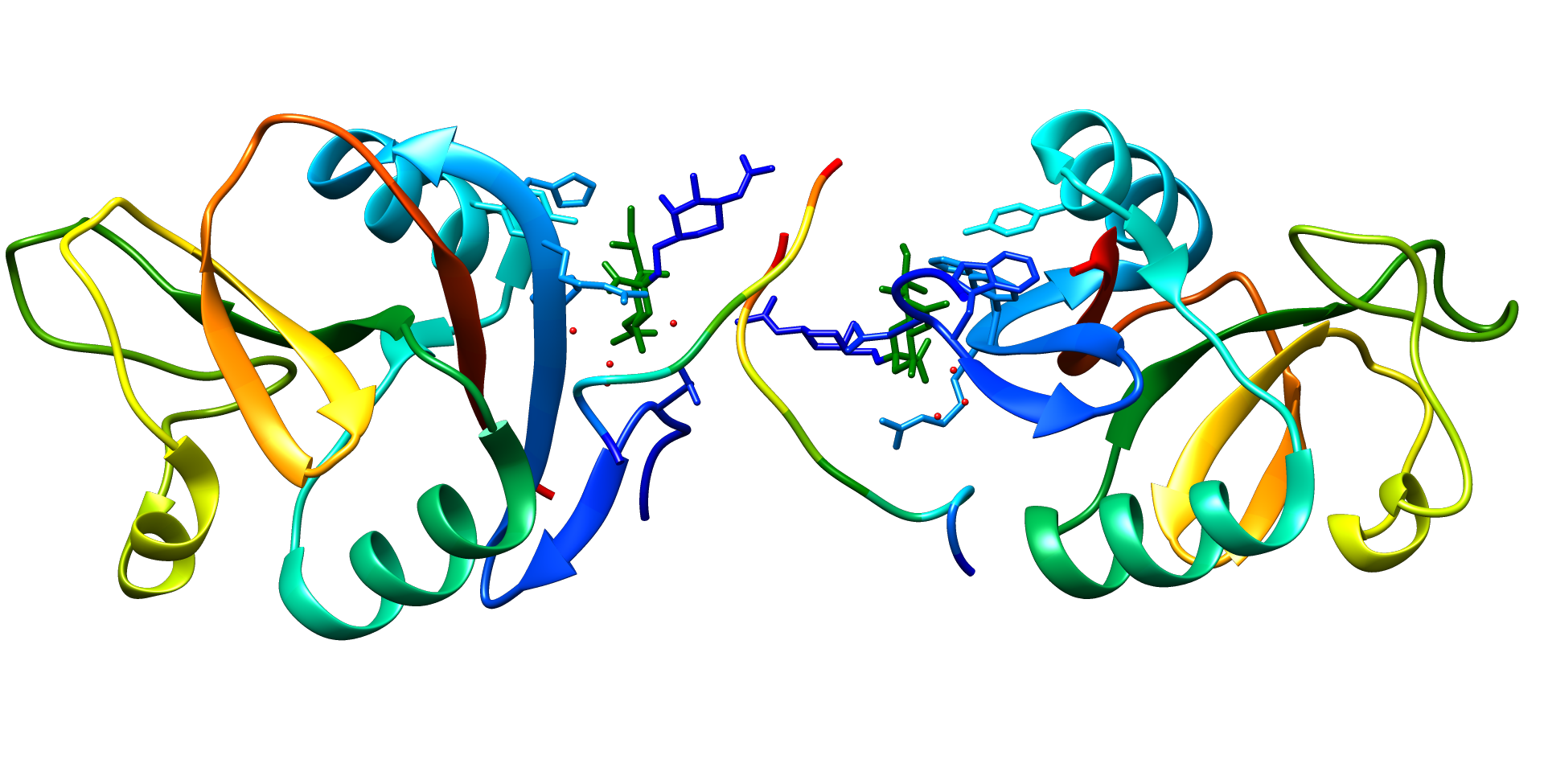

Identifiers
- Aliases: PDPN, AGGRUS, GP36, GP40, Gp38, HT1A-1, OTS8, PA2.26, T1A, T1A-2, T1A2, TI1A, podoplanin, D2-40
- External IDs: OMIM: 608863; MGI: 103098; GeneCards: PDPN
Available structures
| PDB | Ortholog search: PDBe RCSB |
| PDB | List of PDB id codes 3WSR, 4YO0 |

Gene location (Human)
| Chr. | Chromosome 1 (human) |
| Band | 1p36.21 | Start | 13,583,465 bp |
| Band | 1p36.21 | End | 13,617,957 bp |

Gene location (Mouse)
| Chr. | Chromosome 4 (mouse) |
| Band | 4|4 E1 | Start | 142,994,001 bp |
| Band | 4|4 E1 | End | 143,026,134 bp |
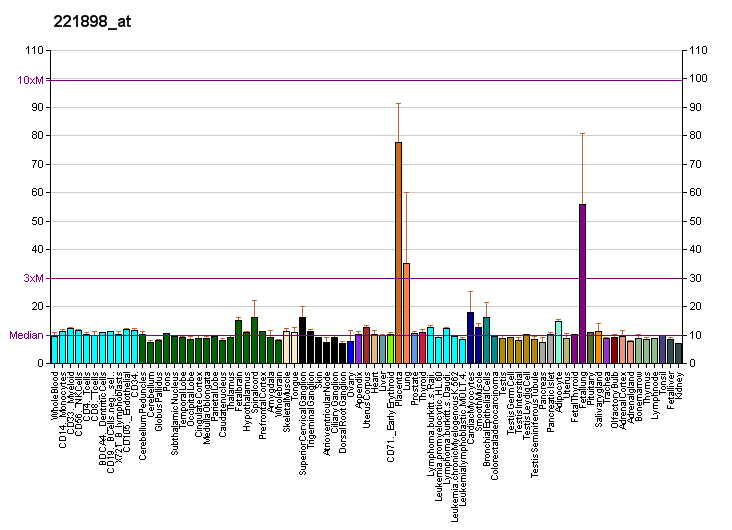

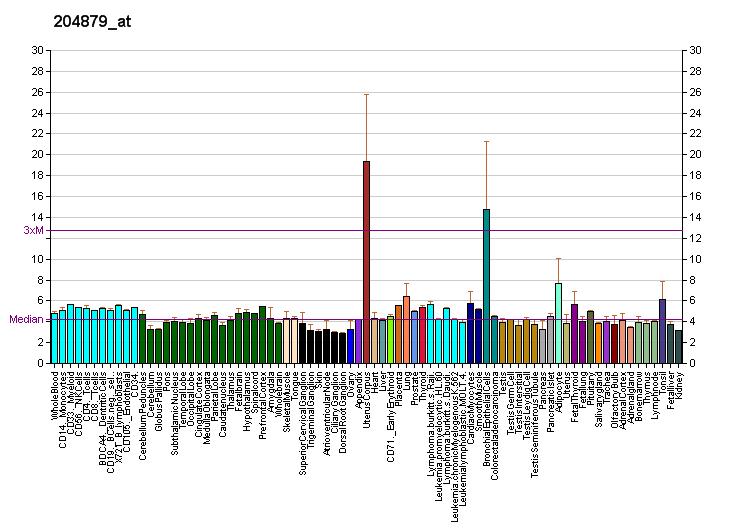
RNA expression pattern
| Bgee | Human / Mouse (ortholog); Top expressed in: tibia; gonad; cartilage tissue; ventricular zone; germinal epithelium; retinal pigment epithelium; secondary oocyte; ganglionic eminence; gallbladder; gastric mucosa / Top expressed in: yolk sac; lung; primary oocyte; zygote; blastocyst; ventricular zone; urinary bladder; secondary oocyte; ovary; lens; More reference expression data |
| BioGPS | More reference expression data |
Gene ontology
| Molecular function | folic acid transmembrane transporter activity; water channel activity; amino acid transmembrane transporter activity; water transmembrane transporter activity; signaling receptor binding; protein binding; chaperone binding; chemokine binding |
| Cellular component | integral component of membrane; integral component of plasma membrane; plasma membrane; membrane; tetraspanin-enriched microdomain; lamellipodium membrane; cytoplasmic vesicle; filopodium membrane; microvillus membrane; ruffle membrane; cell projection; leading edge of lamellipodium; cytoplasm; cytosol; basolateral plasma membrane; apical plasma membrane; cell junction; membrane raft; ruffle; lamellipodium; filopodium |
| Biological process | folic acid transport; water transport; platelet activation; multicellular organism development; regulation of cell shape; amino acid transport; positive regulation of epithelial to mesenchymal transition; positive regulation of cell migration; Rho protein signal transduction; wound healing, spreading of cells; positive regulation of extracellular matrix disassembly; regulation of lamellipodium morphogenesis; cell morphogenesis; lymphangiogenesis; negative regulation of cell population proliferation; lung development; negative regulation of apoptotic process; lymph node development; lymphatic endothelial cell fate commitment; actin-mediated cell contraction; regulation of substrate adhesion-dependent cell spreading; positive regulation of platelet aggregation; regulation of myofibroblast contraction; amino acid transmembrane transport |
Sources:Amigo / QuickGO
Orthologs
| Databases | NCBI: entry; OMA: entry |
| Species | Human | Mouse |
| Entrez | 10630 | 14726 |
| Ensembl | ENSG00000162493 | ENSMUSG00000028583 |
| UniProt | Q86YL7 | Q62011 |
| RefSeq (mRNA) | NM_001006624; NM_001006625; NM_006474; NM_198389; NM_001385053 NM_013317 | NM_001290822; NM_010329 |
| RefSeq (protein) | NP_001006625; NP_001006626; NP_006465; NP_938203 | NP_001277751; NP_034459 |
| Location (UCSC) | Chr 1: 13.58 – 13.62 Mb | Chr 4: 142.99 – 143.03 Mb |
| PubMed search |
- Wikidata
| View/Edit Human | View/Edit Mouse |

Podoplanin is a protein that in humans is encoded by the PDPN gene. It is a small glycoprotein located on the surface membranes of various cell types. While termed PDPN in humans, it is often named: a) OTS-8, gp38, aggrus, antigen PA2.26, or RANDAM-2 (i.e., retinoic acid-induced neuronal differentiated-associated molecule-2) in mice; b) T1α protein or E11 antigen in rats; c) aggrus or gp40 in canines; and d) aggrus in hamsters and cows. The PDPN gene is located on the "p", i.e., short, arm of chromosome 1, region 3, band 1 (location notated as 1p36.21; see Gene nomenclature). This gene directs the formation of PDPN messenger RNA (i.e., mRNA) which in turn directs formation of the PDPN glycoprotein. Here, the term PDPN is used for the non-human as well as human glycoprotein, PDPN is used for the human gene, and Pdpn is used for the animal gene.

Studies to date have suggested that PDPN acts to promote or inhibit a wide range of physiological and pathological reactions in rodents and, in a few studies, humans. However, almost all of these studies are preliminary and require far larger follow-up studies to determine if regulating PDPN levels could be used in humans to treat the various PDPN-regulated functional responses and PDPD-induced disorders. Indeed, studies have not yet determined if the promotion or inhibition of PDPN actions can be used safely in humans.

== Tissues distribution ==
A study on the levels of PDPN in 20 human tissues reported that it was: most highly expressed on the cells in the lung, placenta, heart, trachea, uterus, cerebellum, fetal brain, stomach, thymus, and prostate; less strongly expressed in skeletal muscle, adult brain, thyroid gland, adrenal gland, kidney, salivary gland, and small intestine; and minimally expressed or not detected in cells of the fetal liver, non-fetal liver, and spleen. Other studies have reported that PDPN is expressed by human and/or rodent: a) type I alveolar cells of the lung and kidney podocytes (podoplanin was given its name based on its expression in podocytes); b) endothelial cells lining the lymphatic system but not endothelial cells lining blood vessels; c) reticular cells (i.e., a type of fibroblast that makes extracellular reticular fibers in, e.g., the liver, bone marrow, and lymphatic system) and epithelial cells (also termed ependymocytes or ependymal cells) in the choroid plexuses of the four brain ventricles; d) the glial and microglia cells located in the central nervous system; cells in nasal polyps, mesothelial cells, e) stromal cells, macrophages, activated T helper 17 cells; cells in the basal layer of sweat glands, and external layer of hair follicles; f) a wide range of cancer cells including 80% of squamous cell carcinomas of the lung, larynx, cervix, skin, and esophagus, 25% of oral squamous cell carcinoma cells, 98% of seminoma cells; 69% of embryonal carcinoma cells, 29% of the cells in teratomas, 25% of the cells in endodermal sinus tumors (also termed yoke sac tumors), 98% of the cells in brain germinomas, 71% of the cells in immature brain teratomas, 47% of the cells in brain glioblastomas, 25% of brain anaplastic astrocytomas, 100% of lymphangiomas, 90-100% of Kaposi's sarcomas, 93% of mesotheliomas; and g) the cancer-associated fibroblasts in the tissues of various cancers.

== Structure ==
Human PDPN is a mucin-containing, O-linked glycosyl, type I transmembrane glycoprotein. Type 1 glycoproteins pass through a cell's surface membrane once and have their N-terminal and C-terminal ends located respectively on the extracellular and intracellular sides of their cell's surface membrane. PDPN consists of 162 amino acids with about 128 residing on the outside the cell, about 25 spanning the cell's surface membrane, and 9 residing inside the cell. Human PDPN's structure is similar to that of animal PDPNs in its transmembrane and cytoplasmic portions but has a somewhat different structure in its extracellular portions than that of animals (which vary between different animal species). Human PDPN has a molecular mass of 36 to 43 kilodaltons, depending on the amount of O-linked glycosyl residues it contains. Its extracellular portion consist of four amino acid tandem repeat areas termed platelet aggregation-stimulating domains 1-4, i.e., PLAG 1-4. In addition, PDPN can be released from its parent cells as a PDPN-expressing secreted vesicle or as a free intact protein, circulate in the blood, and be measured in the plasma of humans and animals.

== Activation of CLEC-2 ==
The PLAGs of PDPN expressed on cells, vesicles, or the free protein interact with proteins on the surface of other cells, particularly the C-type lectin-like receptor 2, i.e., CLEC-2 (also termed CLEC1B, 1810061I13Rik, CLEC2, CLEC2B, PRO1384, QDED721, and C-type lectin domain family 1 member B). CLEC-2 is a member of the C-type lectin receptors in the superfamily of pattern recognition receptors (see C-type lectin section on Classification). It is expressed on: the surface membranes of megakaryocytes, platelets, dendritic cells, follicular dendritic cells, mesothelial cells (i.e., simple squamous epithelial cells of mesodermal origin in the mesothelium), epithelial cells in lymphatic vessels, and cancer-associated fibroblasts (i.e., fibroblasts located in cancer tissues). The binding of PLAG-3/PLAG-4 to the extracellular portion of CLEC-2 causes it to be phosphorylated on the tyrosine and lysine amino acids in its intracellular single cytoplasmic tyrosine-XX-lysine sequence (known as a hemi-Immunoreceptor Tyrosine-based Activation Motif or hemITAM, a key structural motif in a protein that is critical for the protein's actions (hemITAM is related to the Immunoreceptor tyrosine-based activation motif, i.e., ITAM). The phosphorylated CLEC-2 then activates tyrosine-protein kinase SYK, i.e., Syk, which in turn activates various pathways that trigger these cells to make certain types of responses (see Signal transduction). CLEC-2 is also activated by the human immunodeficiency virus (i.e., HIV), rhodocytin (a platelet-activating snake venom also termed aggretin), hemin, galectin-9, dextran sulfate, sulfated polysaccharides, fucoidan, ketacine (i.e., an extract of the Polygonaceae family of flowering plants), S100A13 (i.e., S100 calcium-binding protein A13), CLEC7A (also termed C-type lectin domain family 7 member A or dectin-1), and the soot, carbon, and other particles in the exhaust gas of diesel engines.

== Function and clinical significance ==
The PLAG-3/PLAG-4 part of PDPN interacts with the CLEC-2 expressed on the surfaces of platelets and megakaryocytes to promote blood clots, inflammation, lymphangiogenesis (i.e., formation of lymphatic vessels), angiogenesis (i.e., formation of blood vessels), immune surveillance (e.g., killing cancer cells), remodeling the extracellular matrix of normal and cancerous tissues, and epithelial–mesenchymal transitions by which epithelial cells gain migratory and invasive properties to become mesenchymal stem cells that differentiate into cell types that promote cancer metastases. PDPN's interaction with CLEC-2 is generally considered to involve the binding of PDPN on the surface of cells to CLEC-2 on the surface of adjacent cells. However, studies have found that cultured mice and human PDPN-expressing glioblastoma cell lines release PDPN-positive vesicles which when injected into mice activate their platelets. The injection of PDPN-negative vesicles into mice did not activate the platelets suggesting that the PDPN-expressing vesicles activated platelets by binding to their CLEC-2 receptors. Similar platelet-activating effects were seen in cultures of mouse ovarian cancer cells and a mouse model of ovarian cancer. These studies suggest that the release of PDPN-expressing vesicles into the circulation activate blood platelets to cause intravascular blood clots. Finally: a) the plasma levels of soluble PDPN were significantly elevated in patients with various forms of squamous cell carcinoma, adenocarcinomas, rectal cancer, lung cancer, and gastric cancer compared to those of individuals who did not have cancer; b) the levels of soluble plasma PDPN in patients who had metastatic cancer were significantly higher than those of patients with non‐metastatic cancer; and c) the levels of soluble plasma PDPN significantly decreased in patients who were treated for these cancers. While further studies that include larger numbers of patients are needed, this study suggest that measurements of soluble plasma PDPN may be useful for detecting the presence, metastasis, and responses to treatment of these and perhaps other cancers.

=== Platelet activation ===
PDPN activates platelets by binding to their CLEC-2 receptors and thereby causing them to phosphorylate the immunoreceptor tyrosine-based activation motifs on their intercellular portions and activate cell signaling pathways that cause the platelets to bind fibrinogen, aggregate with other platelets, and release various agents such as fibrinogen, adenosine diphosphate, serotonin, von Willebrand factor, platelet-derived growth factor, and transforming growth factor-β, all of which act to further increase platelet activation.

=== Platelet formation ===
Studies in mice have shown that the PDPN expressed on reticular cells in the bone marrow stimulates megakaryocytes (i.e., cells that produce platelets) to proliferate, form platelets, and thereby increase the levels of platelets that circulate in the blood. This effect is due to PDPN binding to the CLEC-2 receptors on megakaryocytes.

=== Hair follicle growth ===
The hair follicle is an organ that resides in the dermal layer of the skin in mammals. The follicle continuously cycles through an anagen phase of growth, catagen phase of apoptosis-driven regression, and telogen phase of relative quiescence. Stem cells in the hair follicle's bulge promote repetitive regeneration of its follicle along with the follicle's hair. Studies in mice showed that PDPN was expressed in the stem cells and keratinocyte-rich regions of the hair follicle during the late anagen but not telogen phase of the hair growth cycle. The application of wax to the skin of female C57BL/6 mice caused hair removal and hair regeneration at days 1 (early-anagen phase) and 5 (mid-anagen phase) after hair removal. PDPN was expressed in lymphatic vessels but not the hair follicles' keratinocytes. At days 8 and 12 (late-anagen phase), however, PDPN was expressed in hair follicle keratinocytes and stem cells. At day 18 (catagen phase), PDPN expression was still present in the keratinocytes; and at day 22 (telogen phase) PDPN was detected in the lymphatic vessel but not hair follicles. Mice that were made to lack PDPN in the keratinocytes of their hair follicles showed increased hair follicle growth during the anagen phase of hair growth compared to mice that had normal levels of PDPN in their keratinocytes. These findings suggest that PDPN deletion promotes hair follicle cycling and growth and that inhibiting PDPN may prove useful for treating hair loss in animals and humans. The involvement of CLEC-2 in the DPDN's inhibition of hair growth was not determined in these studies.

=== Development of blood vessels, lymphatic vessels, and the heart ===
Mouse embryos made deficient in PDPN, CLEC-2, the tyrosine-based activation residues in CLEC-2's cytoplasmic domain, or the cell signaling molecules activated by PDPN's binding to CLEC-2, i.e., Syk, SLP-76, or PLCG2 (also termed PLCγ2), did not separate blood vessels from lymphatic vessels. The lymphatic vessels were dilated, tortuous, rugged, and blood-filled. These changes appeared due to a failure of platelets at the emerging lymphatic-venous vascular junctions in the lymph sacs that develop into lymphatic vessels to stimulate blood-lymphatic vessel separation because: a) the lymphatic endothelial cells did not express PDPN, b) the blood platelets did not express CLEC-2, or c) PDPN-bound CLEC-2 lacked the tyrosine residues that activate platelets or one of the cited platelet-activating pathways. Other studies suggested that the activation of CLEC-2 by the PDPN on lymphatic endothelial cells causes the release of one or more TGF-β proteins that inhibit the migration and proliferation of the lymphatic endothelial cells which otherwise would facilitate blood–lymphatic vessel separation. Studies on these vascular deficiencies in brain tissues reported that early in their embryonic development mice embryos deficient in PDPN or CLEC-2 developed spontaneous hemorrhages throughout their forebrains, midbrains, and hindbrains. This appeared due to a defect in the recruitment of pericytes. Pericytes lie adjacent to vascular endothelial cells and act to protect these cells, alter the blood flow in the developing vessels, regulate the tightness of the blood–brain barrier, and influence new blood vessel formation. It has also been noted that PDPN-deficient or CLEC-2-deficient mice developed brain aneurysms and brain hemorrhages during their embryonic gestation. Treating the mothers carrying PDPN-deficient embryos with a combination of two inhibitors of platelet activation, aspirin and ticagrelor, almost completely blocked the development of these brain hemorrhages. Finally, mouse embryos made to lack PDPN also had a small proepicardial organ (i.e., an organ that forms the heart's epicardium and other cardiac cells), reduced sizes of the cardiac muscle, and defects in their developing hearts' atrium dorsal wall and septum.

=== Development of the lung ===
Mouse embryos express PDPN in their lungs' alveolar epithelial cells (i.e., AEV), pleural cavity mesothelial cells (i.e., PCM), and lymphatic endothelial cells (i.e., LECs). Embryos that: a) had their Pdpn gene deleted in their whole body; b) had their Pdpn gene deleted just in their LECs; c) had their Clec-2 gene deleted in their platelets; or d) made thrombocytopenia (i.e., 90% reductions in the number of circulating platelets) developed severe defects in the development of their lungs that caused them to die from respiratory failure immediately after birth. Their lungs had lumpy surfaces, various other malformations, low levels of ACTA2 (i.e., actin alpha 2, also termed alpha smooth muscle actin or α-SMA) in their lung's interstitium, almost complete absence of lung myofibroblasts that contained ACTA2, abnormal expression of the Wilms tumor protein gene (i.e., Wt1 gene), and a near complete loss of alveolar elastic fibers. Mice that had their Pdpn gene in AEV cells deleted did not show these changes. The study concluded that the PDPN on LECs stimulates the CLEC-2 on platelets and that this is necessary for the development of the lung in mice.

=== Kidney function ===
Two classes of rats, Munich-Wistar-Frömter (i.e., MWF) and Dahl salt-sensitive (i.e., Dahl/SS) rats, spontaneously developed pathological increases in their kidneys' glomerular permeability as defined by their development of proteinuria, i.e., large increases in the levels of the blood protein, albumin, in their urine. This proteinuria is the first sign of kidney damage that may progress to kidney failure. Studies of these rats showed that PDPN is expressed on the foot processes of the kidney podocytes' apical surfaces that face the urinary proximal tubules. These podocytes had lost a) the expression of PDPN and b) the foot process that face the urinary proximal tubules. The studies suggested that the PDPN on podocytes acts to maintain their foot processes and thereby their glomeruli's filtration function and avert the cited kidney damage. As of 2022, the role of CLEC-2 in this development of proteinuria and kidney failure had not been determined.

=== Allergic contact dermatitis ===
Allergic contact dermatitis (i.e., ACD) is a hypersensitivity reaction in which acute or chronic inflammatory skin rashes are caused by the exposure of the skin to an irritating chemical or physical antigen. Langerin-expressing dendritic cells and Langerhans cells are antigen-presenting cells that reside in the skin. They transport the irritating antigen to the nearby lymph nodes that drain the irritated skin site. At these lymph nodes, these antigen-presenting cells pass the irritating antigen to naïve T cells which then initiate the inflammatory skin rash. PDPN is expressed by the fibroblastic reticular cells that act as a scaffold for the antigen-presenting cells to enter the draining lymph nodes while CLEC-2 is expressed on the dendritic cells. Studies suggest the PDPN on the fibroblastic reticular cells interacts with the dendritic cells to promote the movement of the dendritic cells to the draining lymph nodes and thereby for the development of the allergic skin response.

=== Regeneration of the liver after hepatectomy ===
Studies in mice found that regeneration of the liver after partial hepatectomy (i.e., in this study surgical removal of 70% of the liver) was significantly slowed in mice that had their CLEC-2 gene knocked out, had the CLEC-2 only in their platelets knocked out, or had been pretreated with the inhibitor of platelet activation, clopidogrel. This regeneration of the liver was associated with a significant, short-term rise in levels of PDPN that were expressed on the sinusoids (i.e., endothelial cells in the liver's capillaries). The study concluded that this liver regeneration in rats may be promoted by PDPN's activation of CLEC-2.

=== Repair myocardial infarction ===
Less than 5% of the myocardial cells in the hearts of adult mice express PDPN. However, following experimentally induced myocardial infarctions, i.e., heart attacks, adult mice develop greater than six-fold increases in the number of PDPN-expressing cells in the infarct's border zone, areas of developing fibrosis, and nearby activated blood vessels during the heart muscles stages of scar formation and maturation. These findings suggest that PDPN may act to promote the repair and resolution of heart attacks in mice. As of 2024, the role of CLEC-2 in this repair of myocardial infarcted heart tissue had not been established.

=== Atherosclerosis ===
Atherosclerosis is a form of vascular disease in which the walls of arteries develop progressively increasing thickening, hardening, accumulations of atheromatous plaques, and losses in elasticity that can lead to arterial occlusions such as ischemic heart diseases and strokes. Studies in human atherosclerosis and mouse and rat models of atherosclerosis indicated that their atheromatous plaques express CLEC-2 on vascular smooth muscle cells and PDPN on activated macrophages as well as smooth muscle cells. In a rat model of atherosclerosis, however, PDPN was overexpressed in endothelial cells but not in smooth muscle cells. The activation of CLEC-2 by PDPN appeared responsible for worsening but not initiating atherosclerosis in most of the animal models. The activation of CLEC-2 by S100A13 (i.e., S100 calcium-binding protein A13) appeared to initiate and cause the early progression of atherosclerosis while other factors in the developing atherosclerotic lesions increased the expression of PDPN to levels which promoted further progression of the atherosclerotic lesions, presumably by binding to CLEC-2 on and thereby stimulating blood platelets.

=== Ischemia/reperfusion tissue damage ===
Ischemia/reperfusion injury is tissue damage that is worsened rather than improved by restoring the blood flow (i.e., reperfusion) to a tissue that had undergone a period of ischemia (lack of blood flow). In a model of ischemia/reperfusion injury of the brain's cerebral cortex, mice that had their middle cerebral artery occluded developed increased levels of PDPN and CLEC-2 mainly in the neurons and microglia of the afflicted cerebral cortex areas. Pretreatment of these mice with an antibody that blocks PDPN's binding to CLEC-2 reduced the cerebral infarct (i.e., dead tissue) size and attenuated the neurological deficits during the acute and recovery stages of this model. A study of 352 patients with acute ischemic strokes (i.e., sudden blockage or reduction in blood flow to the brain which causes brain tissue damage) who were followed for one year found that patients with higher levels of CLEC-2 in their plasma had higher rates of further vascular events, i.e., recurrent strokes, heart attacks, angina (i.e., chest pain or pressure caused by insufficient blood flow to the heart), and/or peripheral arterial disease (i.e., reductions in arterial blood flow and damage to any tissue excluding the heart and brain) that required treatment. The study also reported that plasma CLEC-2 levels appeared to be an important prognostic factor for patients with acute ischemic strokes. It was presumed that these stokes involve PDPN activation of platelet-bound CLEC-2. The strokes caused by atherosclerosis are commonly associated with inflammation at the sites of arterial narrowing/blockade. This inflammation contributes to the severity of atherosclerosis which in animal modes is promoted by the actions of PDPN.

Ischemia/reperfusion also causes severe kidney injury and malfunction. A study of kidney function in a mouse model of ischemia/reperfusion in the kidney found that it caused PDPN to fall in the kidney's glomeruli and interstitium of the kidney's tubules shortly after ischemia/reperfusion. The intensity of PDPN decline on the tubular interstitial compartment cells increased with the severity of the ischemia. The study suggested that PDPN was shed from the podocytes in vesicles to the urine and internalized by the proximal tubule epithelium cells and nearby reticular cells which in turn promoted further injuries to the kidneys. These studies did not determine if CLEC-2 is involved in the kidney damage.

=== Deep vein thrombosis ===
Deep vein thrombosis (i.e., DVT) is a form of venous thrombosis in which blood clots form in deep rather than superficial veins and has a high mortality rate. In a model of DVT caused by vascular narrowing (i.e., stenosis) of the inferior vena cava (a large deep vein that transports blood from the lower and middle body to the heart), mice: a) made to lack CLEC-2 were completely protected from forming DVT; b) made to lack CLEC-2 only in their platelets had significantly reduced venous thromboses and transfusing them with CLEC-2-expressing platelets restored full thrombus formation; c) made to have very low blood platelet levels had reduced venous thromboses; and d) treated with an anti-PDPN antibody had significant reductions in the sizes of their DVTs. The study concluded that in mice the activation of CLEC-2 in platelets by the PDPNs located in the inferior vena cava walls contributes to the formation of DVTs.

=== Cancer-associated venous thromboembolisms ===
Cancer-associated venous thromboembolisms (cVTEs) are cancer-associated blood clots in the veins of the systemic circulation with or without involvement of the pulmonary circulation (the latter are termed pulmonary emboli). Preclinical studies in rodent models of cancer-associated cVTEs indicate that the activation CLEC-2 by PDPN causes cVTEs in certain types of cancer. For example: a) mice injected with B16F10 cells (i.e., a highly aggressive form of mouse B16 melanoma that express PDPN) caused extensive pulmonary tumors and pulmonary vein thromboses but mice depleted of CLEC-2 by injecting them with the anti-CLEC-2 antibody 2A2B10 greatly reduced the extent of their pulmonary vein thromboses; b) nude mice (i.e., mice with suppressed immune systems) that were injected with tumor causing PDPN-expressing C8161 melanoma or Chinese hamster ovary cells developed tumors and extensive cVTEs whereas mice injected with either of these two cell types that had been pretreated with the antibody SZ-168 that inhibits PDPN binding to CLEC-2 developed far smaller cVTEs; and c) nude mice inoculated with PDPN-expressing human oral squamous carcinoma cells developed extensive cVTEs and suffered shorter survival times than nude mice similarly inoculated with human oral squamous carcinoma cells that had greatly reduced levels of PDPN. These and several other studies in rodents indicate that the activation of CLEC-2 by PDPN promotes the formation of cVTEs in these cancer models.

As first recognized in 1865 by Armand Trousseau (see Trousseau syndrome), cVTEs often occur in humans with cancer. A study published in 2007 of 1,015,598 cancer patient hospitalizations found that: a) 4.1% of the patients developed cVTEs; b) patients with the highest rates of developing a cVTE had pancreas (8.1% of cases), kidney (5.6%), ovary (5.6%), lung (5.1%), or stomach (4.9%) cancer; and c) patients with cancers of the lung or upper gastrointestinal tract had the highest rates of developing lethal cVTEs. (Gioioso et al., 2024 gave a more extensive list on the rates of cVTEs in different cancers.) Other studies have reported that patients with: a) breast cancer, prostate cancer, or melanoma skin cancer had low rates of developing cVTEs. Cancers that have spread locally or metastasized to other tissues were associated with a higher risk of developing cVTEs. For example, about 50% of patients presenting with cVTEs had metastatic cancers at the time of diagnosis. Furthermore, patients were at the highest risk of developing cVTEs during the first 3 months after cancer diagnosis but thereafter had a decreasing incidence of developing cVTEs although this risk remained higher than the general population for up to 15 years after their cancers first presentation.

Three types of cancers in humans, i.e., aggressive brain tumor, squamous cell carcinoma of the lung, and adenosquamous lung carcinoma have been associated with PDPN-related cVTEs. A study was conducted for a median of 24 months on 213 patients with an aggressive brain tumor: 150 had a glioblastoma, 2 had a gliosarcoma, 30 had an anaplastic astrocytoma, 7 had an anaplastic oligodendroglioma, 1 had an anaplastic ependymoma, 8 had a diffuse astrocytoma (i.e., an astrocytoma with ill-defined boundaries), and 15 had other types of aggressive brain tumors. Twenty-nine of these patients (13.6%) developed cVTEs with 15 of the cVTEs being in the leg (51.7%), 13 in the lung (44.8%), and 1 in the arm (3.4%). Overall, 151 (70.9%) of these patients had tumors that expressed PDPN (71 at low, 47 at medium, and 33 at high levels). PDPN levels were higher in patients who had more extensive cVTEs. i.e., higher tumor levels of intravascular aggregated platelet clusters, lower platelet levels in their blood, and a higher incidence of deep vein cVTEs. Patients with low, medium, and high PDPN tumor tissue levels had respectively 2.78-fold, 4.70-fold, and 4.44-fold higher death rates than individuals with undetectable levels of PDPN in their cancer tissues. These findings suggest that the PDPN in aggressive brain cancers promotes cVTEs and that measuring the levels of PDPN in these cancers may be useful for identifying patients with high risks of developing cVTEs and therefore might benefit from thromboprophylaxis measures (i.e., therapy to prevent blood clots) such as treatment with low-molecular-weight heparin. Another study reported that patients with brain tumors that expressed a normal IDH1 gene (the gene for isocitrate dehydrogenase) and high levels of PDPN had a significantly greater risk of developing cVTEs compared to patients with a mutated IDH1 gene and no PDPN expression (the 6‐month risks of developing cVTEs were 18.2% vs. 0%, respectively). The mutant IDH gene caused hypermethylation of CpG islands (see CpG island hypermethylation) in the PDPN gene promoter that result in decreased PDPN expression. Finally, study of 139 patients with squamous cell carcinoma of the lung and 27 patients with adenosquamous lung carcinoma found that PDPN was detected on the membranes of tumor cells and in lymphatic vessels of 105 of these patients. The median time to a 50% mortality rate for PDPN-negative patients was 18.5 months but for PDPN-positive patients was only 9.8 months. Over a 5-year follow-up period, 20 (12.05%) patients developed a cVTE. The expression of PDPN was undetected in 61, low in 35, medium in 43, and high in 27 cases with 7.2%, 8.6%, 16.9% and 21.8% of these respective cases. The differences in survival times in the PDPN-positive versus PDPN-negative patients and the intensities of PDPN expression in patients expressing or not expressing cVTEs were significantly different. This study concluded that high PDPN expression levels are associated with an increased risk of developing cVTEs and that higher levels of PDPN expression in these lung carcinomas are associated with poorer prognoses regardless of the patient's age, sex, or tumor grade.

=== Cancer ===
PDPN is overly expressed or expressed for the first time on the tumor cells in a proportion of individuals with: a) varying types of breast cancer; b) epithelial cell carcinomas such as those of the cervix, larynx, oral cavity, tongue, skin and lung; c) angiosarcomas (i.e., cancers of blood or lymphatic vessel endothelial cells), chondrosarcomas (i.e., cancer of bone cartilage cells), osteosarcomas, (i.e., cancer of bone cells), germ cell tumors (i.e., cancers arising from the germ cells in the ovaries or testicles), gliomas (i.e., cancers of the glial cells in the brain or spinal cord), glioblastomas (i.e., highly aggressive cancers of the brain), and squamous cell carcinomas of the skin, esophagus, uterus, lung, cervix, bladder, head, neck, and mouth; and d) melanomas, extramammary Paget's disease (i.e., cancer of large epithelial carcinoma cells termed Paget's cells that develop in the dermoepidermal junction of the skin in areas outside of the breast such as the vulva, perineum, torso, belly button, inguinal canal, and axilla), mycosis fungoides, (i.e., the most common form of cutaneous T-cell lymphomas), and Sézary disease (another form of cutaneous T-cell lymphoma). PDPN is also abnormally expressed by the cancer-associated fibroblasts (i.e., CAFs) in adenocarcinoma of the lung, squamous-cell carcinoma of the lung, adenocarcinoma of the breast, adenocarcinoma of the pancreas, cholangiocarcinoma (i.e., cancer of the bile duct), adenocarcinoma of the esophagus, and melanomas. The expression of PDPN, particularly at high levels, in the cancer cells and/or CAFs has been associated with increased incidences of developing metastasis and shorter survival times in patients with most of these cancers. However, other studies have reported that the absence of PDPN in squamous cell cancer of the cervix and the mixed, glandular-epithelial form of cervical cancer, as well as the expression of relatively low PDPN levels in the CAFs of colon cancers were associated with more aggressive diseases and poorer survival times. These and other contradictory findings on the effects of PDPN on severity and survival times of the cancers indicate that further studies are needed to clarify the associations of PDPN levels with the severity of these cancers. Some of these needed studies have been conducted on breast cancer patients presenting with PDPN-expressing CAFs. A 2024 review of 27 studies on a total of 6,830 patients with breast cancer reported that the high expression of PDPN on the CAFs of this cancer was associated with significantly reduced recurrence-free survival times, disease-free survival times, metastasis-free survival times, and event-free survival (i.e., cancer recurrence, cancer progression that cannot be treated surgically, or death due to any cause). The role CLEC-2 in these cancers have not been defined.

=== Inhibitors ===
Various antibodies have been developed that inhibit the activities of PDPN. These include antibodies that: a) bind to and block PDPN's binding to CLEC-2 such as the monoclonal antibodies NZ-1 (also termed podoplanin monoclonal antibody NZ-1.3), SZ-168, and chLpMab-2, and the polyclonal antibody, sc-134483 (also known as glycoprotein 38 and gp38); and b) the antibodies 2CP and 2A2B10 which bind to CLEC-2 thereby blocking its binding of PDPN. These antibodies may prove useful for treating PDPN-promoted disorders in animal models but need further studies to determine if they can be used safely when injected into humans. Three compounds, cobalt hematoporphyrin (i.e., cobalt complexed with hematoporphyrin), protoporphyrin IX, and protoporphyrin IX complexed with cobalt (termed cobalt hematoporphyrin) bind to CLEC-2 thereby inhibiting its activation by PDPN. These three compounds suppress PDPN-induced platelet aggregation and cancer metastasis in animal models.

NIR-PIT (i.e., near-infrared photoimmunotherapy) is a recently developed method to treat cancers. It uses an antibody-IRDye700DX complex (i.e., a monoclonal antibody conjugated to the phthalocyanine dye, IRdye700DX). The conjugated antibody is made to bind a target protein expressed on cancer cells. Following this binding, the antibody-IRDye700DX complex kills these cells when exposed to a beam of near-infrared light. A study has used antibody-IRDye700DX in which IRDye700DX was conjugated to a commercial antibody termed 8.1.1 that binds to mouse PDPN. This conjugate was injected into mice that had been injected with mouse oral squamous cell carcinoma cancer cells (i.e., MOC cells) and had developed large MOC tumors. This PDPN-targeted NIR-PIT procedure: a) killed PDPN-expressing MOC cancer cells and PDPN-expressing cancer-associated fibroblast (i.e., CAFs) with little or no injury to other cells, b) suppressed the progression of these tumors, c) prolonged the survival of these mice; d) caused minimal damage to PDPN-expressing lymphatic vessel; and e) exerted a lesser but statistically significant therapeutic effect by killing the PDPN-expressing CAFs in MOC tumors that did not have PDPN-positive cancer cells. The authors suggested that further studies may show that this NIR-PIT method will prove useful for treating patients with tumors that express PDPN in their cancer cells and/or CAFs.

Working within the same cell, the transmembrane part of PDPN interacts with tetraspanin 9 and the CD44 cell surface glycoprotein. The intracellular portion of PDPN interacts with intracellular ezrin and radixin and the surface membrane protein moesin. Further studies on these interactions may lead to the development of agents that interrupt these interactions and thereby be useful for inhibiting the deleterious actions of PDPN.
