= CLEC1B =

Protein-coding gene in humans

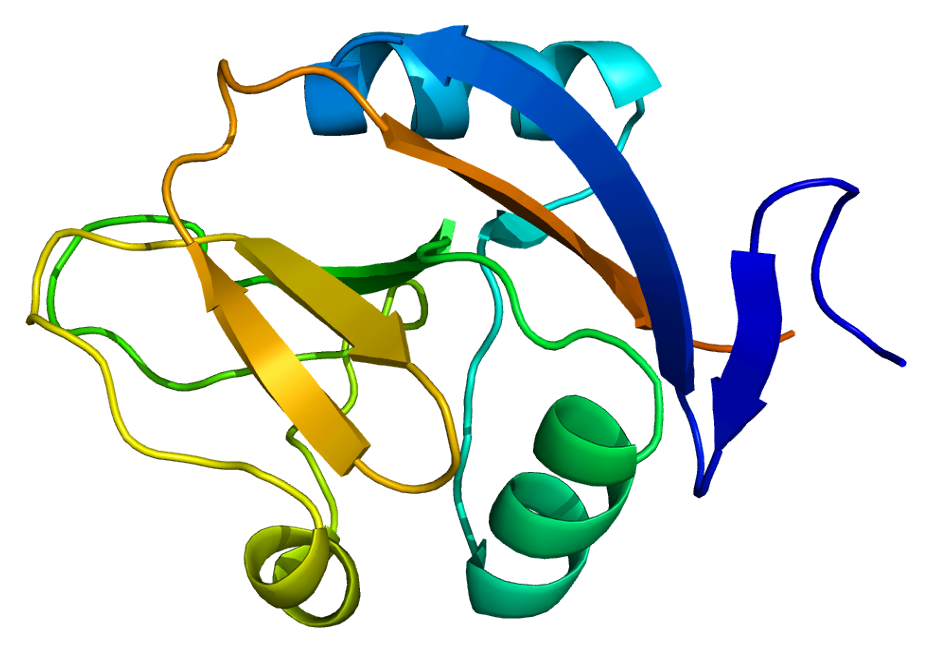

Identifiers
- Aliases: CLEC1B, 1810061I13Rik, CLEC2, CLEC2B, PRO1384, QDED721, C-type lectin domain family 1 member B
- External IDs: OMIM: 606783; MGI: 1913287; GeneCards: CLEC1B
Available structures
| PDB | Ortholog search: PDBe RCSB |
| PDB | List of PDB id codes 2C6U, 3WSR, 3WWK |

Gene location (Human)
| Chr. | Chromosome 12 (human) |
| Band | 12p13.31-p13.2 | Start | 9,985,642 bp |
| Band | 12p13.31-p13.2 | End | 10,013,424 bp |

Gene location (Mouse)
| Chr. | Chromosome 6 (mouse) |
| Band | 6|6 F3 | Start | 129,374,260 bp |
| Band | 6|6 F3 | End | 129,386,298 bp |
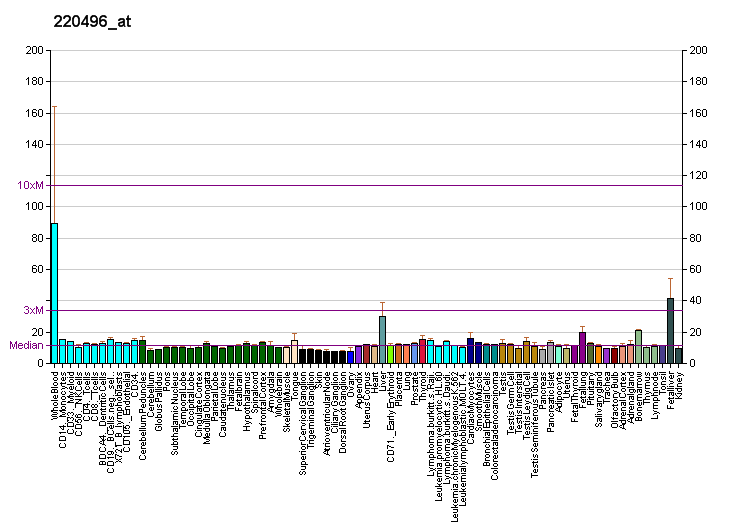
RNA expression pattern
| Bgee | Human / Mouse (ortholog); Top expressed in: monocyte; testicle; liver; right lobe of liver; granulocyte; trabecular bone; blood; bone marrow; buccal mucosa cell; bone marrow cell / Top expressed in: blood; tibiofemoral joint; spleen; mesenteric lymph nodes; granulocyte; hepatobiliary system; liver; embryo; right lung; right lung lobe; More reference expression data |
| BioGPS | More reference expression data |
Gene ontology
| Molecular function | protein binding; carbohydrate binding; transmembrane signaling receptor activity |
| Cellular component | integral component of membrane; plasma membrane; integral component of plasma membrane; membrane |
| Biological process | platelet activation; defense response; cell surface receptor signaling pathway; platelet formation; signal transduction |
Sources:Amigo / QuickGO
Orthologs
| Databases | NCBI: entry; OMA: entry |
| Species | Human | Mouse |
| Entrez | 51266 | 56760 |
| Ensembl | ENSG00000165682 | ENSMUSG00000030159 |
| UniProt | Q9P126 | Q9JL99 |
| RefSeq (mRNA) | NM_001099431; NM_016509; NM_001393342 | NM_001204239; NM_001204253; NM_019985 |
| RefSeq (protein) | NP_001092901; NP_057593 | NP_001191168; NP_001191182; NP_064369 |
| Location (UCSC) | Chr 12: 9.99 – 10.01 Mb | Chr 6: 129.37 – 129.39 Mb |
| PubMed search |
- Wikidata
| View/Edit Human | View/Edit Mouse |

C-type lectin domain family 1 member B (also termed CLEC-1b, C-type lectin-like receptor 2, CLEC-2, CLEC2, CLEC2B, PRO1384, QDED721, C-type lectin domain family 1 member B, CLEC1B, activation-induced C-type lectin, AICL, and 1810061I13Rik) is a cell surface receptor protein. It binds certain biomolecules that act as ligands that when bound to the CLEC-1b expressed by cells stimulates certain functions in these cells. The human CLEC-1b receptor is encoded by the CLEC1B gene which is located on the short (i.e., "p")-arm of chromosome 12 at region 1, band 3, sub-band 1 to sub-band 2 (position notated as 12p13.31-p13.2).<https://www.ncbi.nlm.nih.gov/gene/387836> Most of the recent literature terms the C-type lectin domain family 1 member B as CLEC-2. Since current reports commonly use CLEC-2 rather than CLEC-1b, CLEC-2 will be used here in place of CLEC1b in further describing this protein.

CLEC-2 is a member of the broad family of pattern recognition receptors (i.e., PRRs). Vertebrate PRRs can be classified into five types based on their structural similarities: a) toll-like receptors, b) NOD-like receptors, c) RIG-I-like receptors, d) AIM2 (also termed absent in melanoma 2 or interferon-inducible protein AIM2), and e) C-type lectin receptors (i.e., CLR). CLRs are a superfamily of more than 1,000 proteins. They are subdivided into 17 subgroups. All members of this family possess one or more C-type lectin-like domains, i.e., protein domains that have a characteristic loop-in-a-loop structure formed by their amino acid sequences which form a large loop that encloses a smaller, internal loop or some other type of secondary structure. These internal loops or other structures are formed by two disulfide bridges located at the bases of these loops. CLEC-2 is a C-type lectin receptor.

== Agents activating CLEC-2 ==
While podoplanin is the most studied activator of CLEC-2, CLEC-2 is also activated by: rhodocytin (a platelet-activating snake venom also termed aggretin); hemin (an iron-containing porphyrin containing chlorine); galectin-9; the human immunodeficiency virus (which causes the acquired immunodeficiency syndrome, i.e. AIDs); dextran sulfate; sulfated polysaccharides; fucoidan (a long chain sulfated polysaccharide found in various species of brown algae); katacine (an extract of the Polygonaceae family of flowering plants); S100A13 (i.e., S100 calcium-binding protein A13); humsn CLEC7A (also termed C-type lectin domain family 7 member A or dectin-1); and the soot, carbon, and other particles in the exhaust gas of diesel engines.

== Cells expressing CLEC-2 ==
CLEC-2 is highly expressed on mouse and human platelets as well as megakaryocytes, i.e., platelet-forming cells. It is also expressed on the surface membranes of myeloid cells (i.e., a broad category of blood cells that originate from hematopoietic stem cells in the bone marrow and differentiate into NK cells, B cells; platelets, dendritic cells, follicular dendritic cells, mesothelial cells (i.e., simple squamous epithelial cells of mesodermal origin in the mesothelium), epithelial cells in lymphatic vessels, and cancer-associated fibroblasts (i.e., non-malignant fibroblasts that are located in cancer tissues).

== Functions of activated CLEC-2 ==
=== Podoplanin activation of CLEC-2 ===
Based primarily on preclinical studies done in rodents, podoplanin-induced activation of CLEC-2 (see the podoplanin page for details): a) on megakaryocytes promotes their production of platelets; b) ischemia/reperfusion tissue damage, cancer-associated venous thromboembolisms, atherosclerosis, and regeneration of the liver after 70% of it is removed experimentally; and c) on the platelets of fetuses in order for them to develop normal blood vessels, lymphatic vessels, the heart, and lung.

=== S100A13 activation of CLEC-2 ===
Studies in isolated human and mouse aortas and mice strongly suggest that the S100A13 expressed on the surface of smooth muscle cells is responsible for activating platelets and causing thrombus formation during the early stages of thrombus formation before podoplanin is expressed.

=== C-type lectin domain family 7 member A activation of CLEC-2 ===
Studies in various cultured cell systems indicate that the CLEC7A (i.e., C-type lectin domain family 7 member protein, also termed dectin-1) from humans (sometimes notated as hdectin-1) as well as the dectin-1 proteins isolated from the cells of higher primates activate human as well as mouse CLEC-2. However, the CLEC7A protein isolated from mouse cells (sometimes notated as mdectin-1) does not activate human or mouse CLEC-2. A structurally similar protein, CLEC6A (i.e., C-type lectin domain containing 6A, also termed dectin-2) has a very different set of actions and does not activate CLEC-2. CLEC7A (i.e., dectin-1) in humans is expressed on the surface membranes of vascular endothelial cells, tissue dendritic cells, tissue macrophages, and circulating white blood cells such as neutrophils, monocytes, and circulating dendritic cells. CLEC7A identifies and interacts with various fungi (e.g., yeast, Candida albicans, Pneumocystis jirovecii and Aspergillus species to promote immune responses against these pathogens. CLEC7A also stimulates isolated human platelets and mouse platelets made to express human CLEC-2 but not mouse platelets expressing mouse CLEC-2. Further studies in mice made to express human CLEC-2 in place of mouse CLEC2 were found to stimulate platelets without triggering venous thromboses whereas podoplanin triggered both platelet activation and venous thromboses. These latter findings suggest that CLEC7A is a comparatively moderate antihemorrhagic agent (i.e., inhibitor of bleeding) which may control physiological processes through platelets thrombosis-independent mechanisms. Further studies may show that CLEC-2 is useful for inhibiting bleeding without causing thrombosis.

== See also ==
Podoplanin
