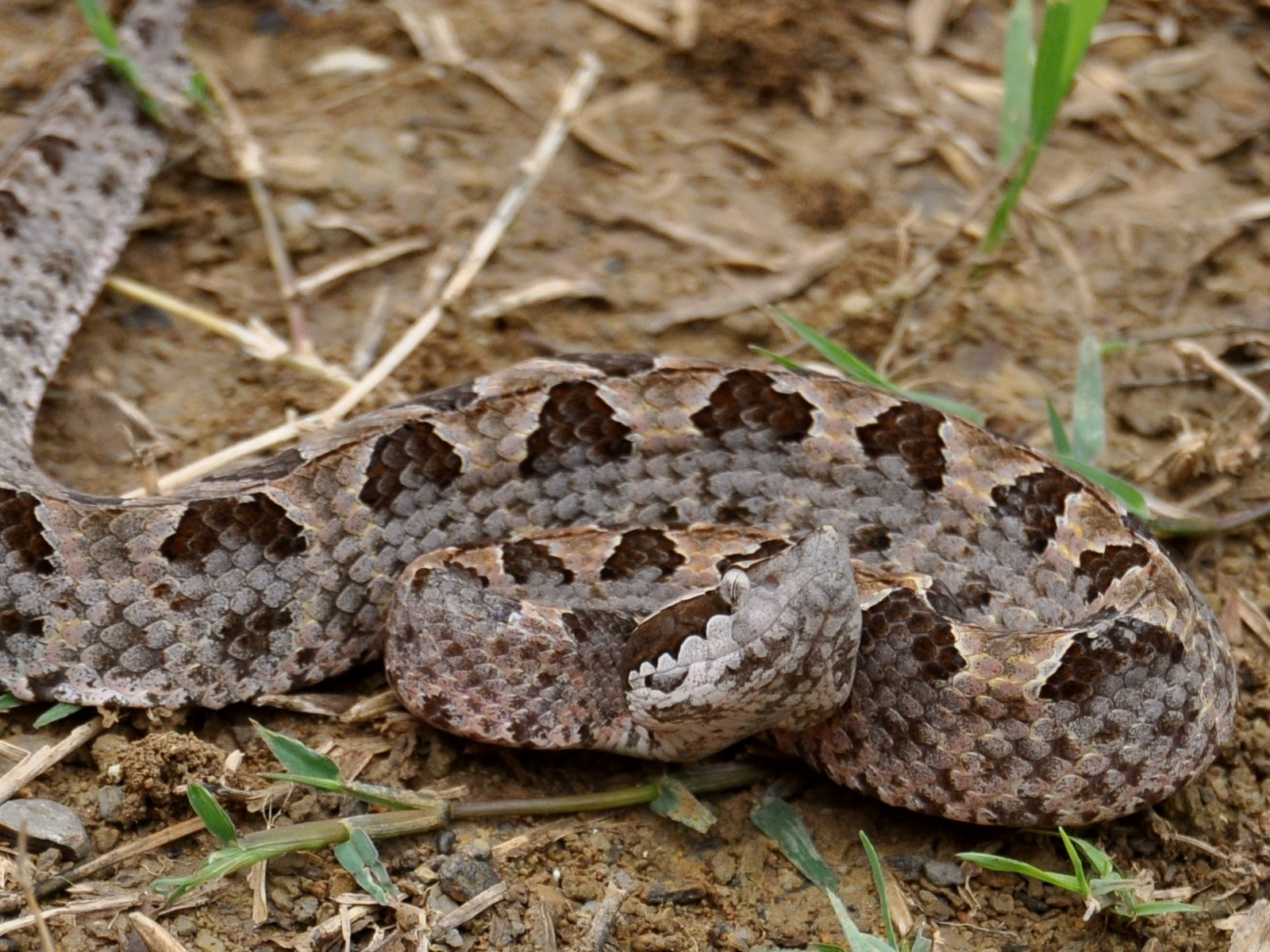

Conservation status
- Least Concern (IUCN 3.1)

Scientific classification
- Kingdom: Animalia
- Phylum: Chordata
- Class: Reptilia
- Order: Squamata
- Suborder: Serpentes
- Family: Viperidae
- Subfamily: Crotalinae
- Genus: Calloselasma; Cope, 1860
- Species: C. rhodostoma

Binomial name
- Calloselasma rhodostoma (Kuhl, 1824)

Synonyms
- List: Agkistrodon Palisot de Beauvois, 1799; Trigonocephalus Kuhl, 1822; Tisiphone Fitzinger, 1843; Leiolepis A.M.C. Duméril, 1853; Ancistrodon Baird, 1854; Calloselasma Cope, 1860; [Trigonocephalus] rhodostoma Kuhl, 1824; [Trigonocephalus] rhodostoma – F. Boie, 1827; [Trigonocephalus] praetextatus Gravenhorst, 1832; Tisiphone rhodostoma – Fitzinger, 1843; L[eiolepis]. rhodostoma – A.M.C. Duméril, 1853; [Calloselasma] rhodostomus – Cope, 1860; T[isiphone]. rhodostoma – W. Peters, 1862; T[rigonocephalus]. (Tisiphone) rhodostoma – Jan, 1863; Calloselasma rhodostoma – Günther, 1864; Calloselma rhodostoma – Morice, 1875; Ancistrodon rhodostoma – Boettger, 1892; Ancistrodon rhodostoma – Boulenger, 1896; Agkistrodon rhodostoma – Barbour, 1912; Ancistrodon (Calloselasma) rhodostoma – Bourret, 1927; Ancistrodon annamensis Angel, 1933; [Agkistrodon] annamensis – Pope, 1935; Calloselasma rhodostoma – Campden-Main, 1970

= Calloselasma =

Genus of snakes

Common names: Malayan ground pit viper, Malayan pit viper, Malayan ground snake, Malayan moccasin, Javan pit viper, Indonesian pit viper.

Calloselasma is a monotypic genus created for a pit viper species, Calloselasma rhodostoma, which is endemic to Southeast Asia from Thailand to northern Malaysia and on the island of Java. No subspecies are currently recognized.

== Geographic range ==
Found in Nepal, Thailand, Cambodia, Laos, Vietnam, northern West Malaysia and on the Indonesian island of Java. The type locality is listed as "Java". There are unconfirmed, but credible reports from southern Myanmar (Burma), northern Sumatra and northern Borneo.

== Description ==
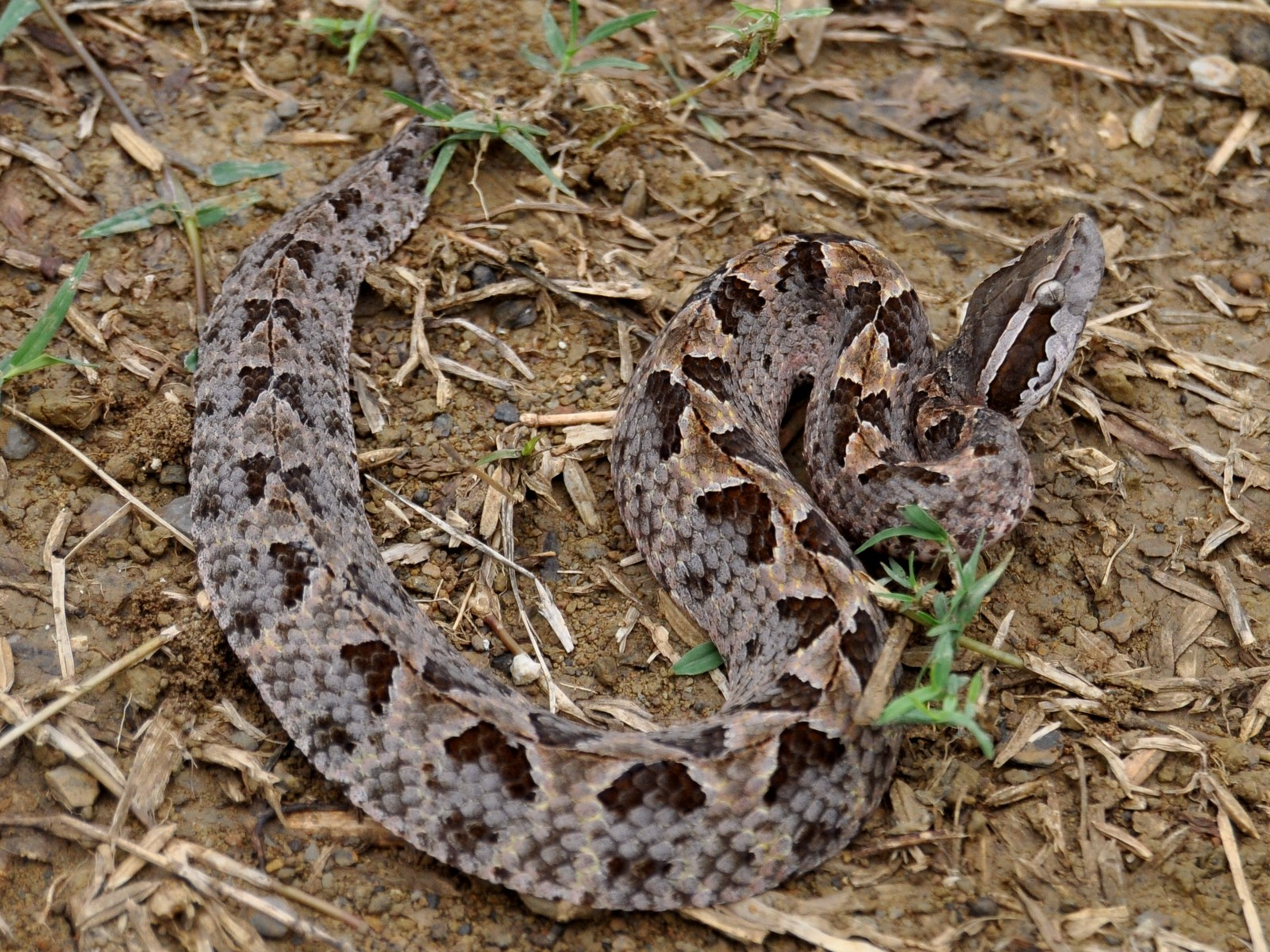
From Karawang, West Java

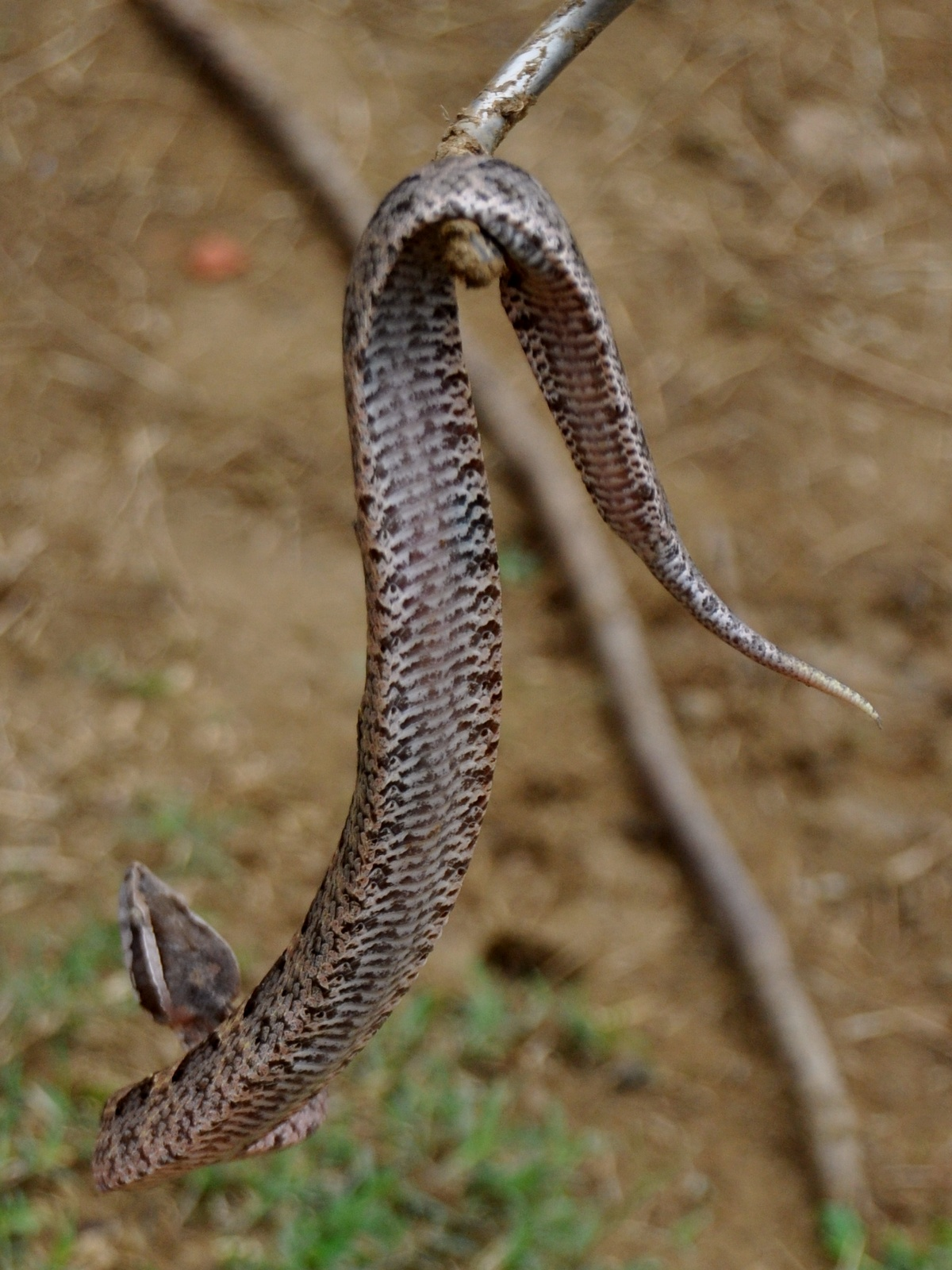
Underside of its body

Attains an average total length of 76 cm (30 in), with females being slightly longer than males. Occasionally, they may grow as long as 91 cm (36 in).

A specimen with a total length of 81 cm (32 in) has a tail 9 cm (3.5 in) long.

Dorsally it is reddish, grayish, or pale brown, with two series of large, dark brown, black-edged triangular blotches, which are alternating or opposite. There is also a thin dark brown vertebral stripe, which may be interrupted or indistinct in some specimens. The upper labials are pink or yellowish, and powdered with brown. There is a broad, dark brown, black-edged diagonal stripe from the eye to the corner of the mouth, with a narrower light-colored stripe above it. Ventrally it is yellowish, uniform or powdered or spotted with grayish brown.

The smooth dorsal scales are arranged in 21 rows at midbody. Ventrals 138-157; anal plate entire; subcaudals 34-54 pairs.

Snout pointed and upturned. Rostral as deep as broad. Two internasals and two prefrontals. Frontal as long as or slightly longer than its distance from tip of snout, as long as or slightly shorter than the parietals. 7-9 upper labials. Loreal pit not in contact with the upper labials.

This is the only Asian pit viper with large crown scales and smooth dorsal scales.

== Habitat and diet ==
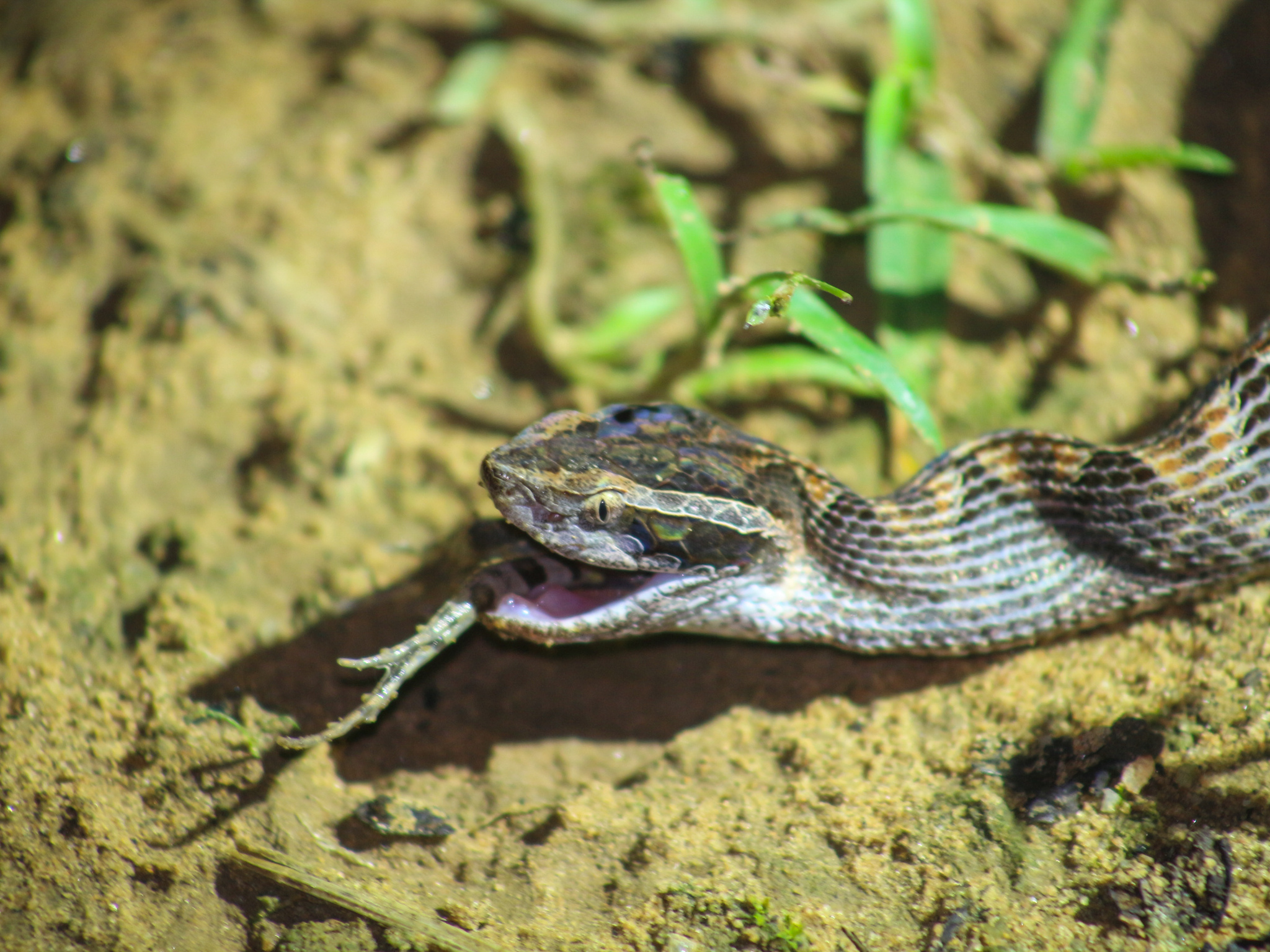
Eating a frog, in Cambodia

Prefers coastal forests, bamboo thickets, unused and overgrown farmland, orchards, plantations as well as forests around plantations, where it searches for rats and mice.

== Reproduction ==
This species is oviparous and the eggs are guarded by the female after deposition.

== Venom ==
This species has a reputation for being bad-tempered and quick to strike. In northern Malaysia it is responsible for some 700 incidents of snakebite annually with a mortality rate of about 2 percent. Remarkably sedentary, it has often been found in the same spot several hours after an incident involving humans. Its venom causes severe pain and local swelling and sometimes tissue necrosis, but deaths are not common. Many victims are left with dysfunctional or amputated limbs due to the lack of antivenom and early treatment. In a 2005 study of 225 Malayan pit viper (Calloselasma rhodostoma) bites in Thailand, most victims had mild to moderate symptoms, but 27 of 145 patients (18.6%) developed permanently swollen limbs. There were only two deaths (related to intracerebral hemorrhage) and no amputations. The antivenin manufactured in Thailand seemed effective in reversing the blood clotting caused by the venom. Most patients remained stable and did not require antivenin. The authors suggested that victims not use traditional healers and avoid overuse of tourniquets. In a prospective phase of the study, bites occurred throughout the year but mostly early in the monsoon season (May and June).

The venom acts, at least in part, by binding to and activating the C-type lectin domain family 1 member B protein (also termed the CLEC1B or CLEC2 protein) on platelets. PDPN is a protein in humans that also binds to CLEC18 and like Calloselasma venom causes extensive thromboses reactions. Rhodocytin from the venom activates platelets and thrombus formation.

=== Venom and thrombosis treatment ===
The venom of this species is used to isolate a thrombin-like enzyme called ancrod. This enzyme is used clinically to break down and dissolve thrombi (blood clots) in patients and lower blood viscosity to help prevent heart attack and stroke.
