= Calcium dobesilate =

Chemical compound

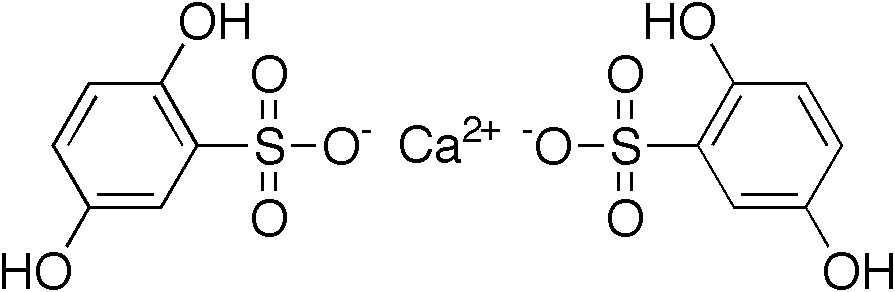

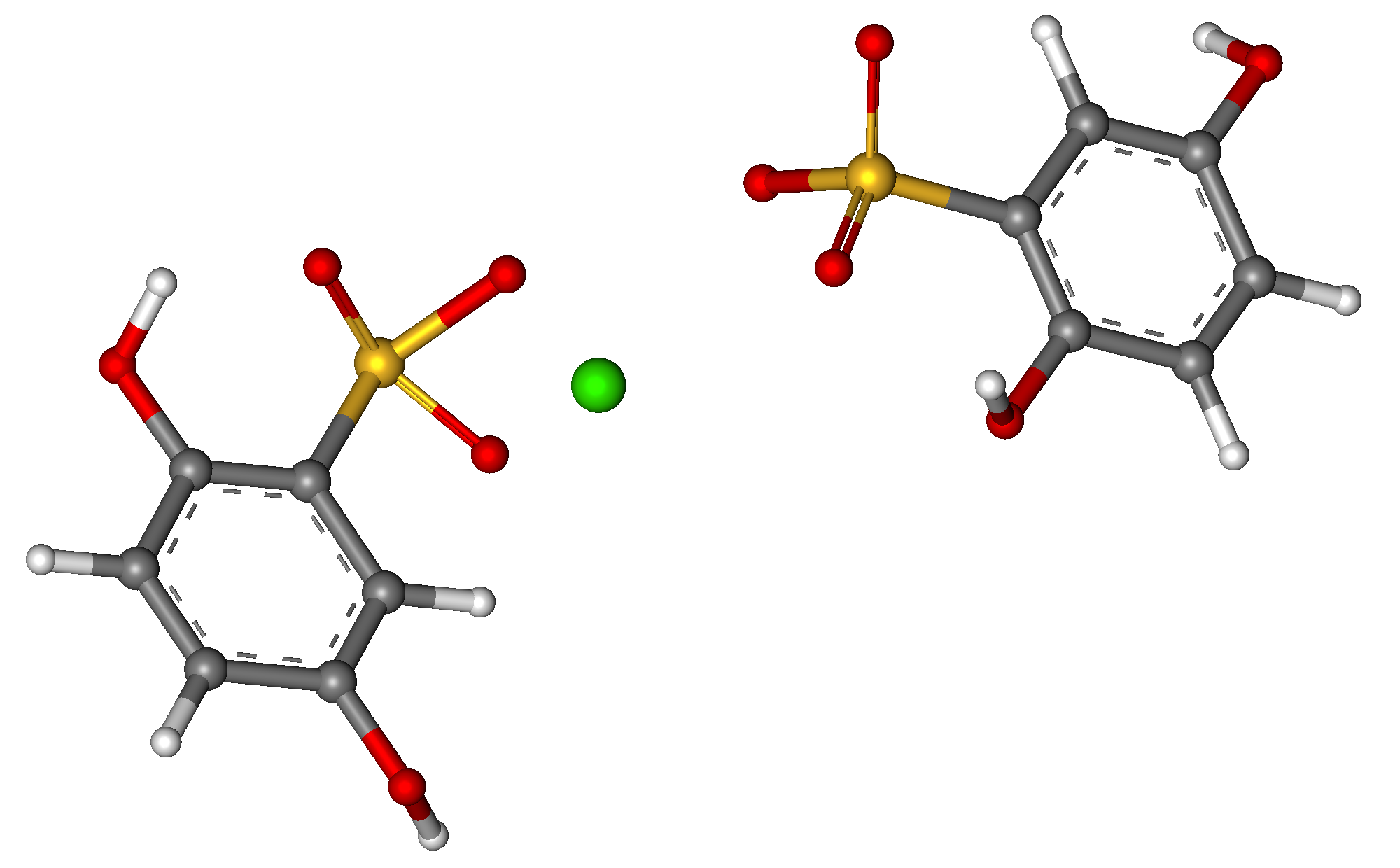

Clinical data
- AHFS/Drugs.com: International Drug Names
- ATC code: C05BX01 (WHO)

Identifiers
- IUPAC name: calcium 2,5-dihydroxybenzenesulfonate
- CAS Number: 20123-80-2; monohydrate: 117552-78-0
- PubChem CID: 29963
- DrugBank: DBSALT002519; monohydrate: DBSALT003025
- ChemSpider: 27837
- UNII: 5921X1560Q; monohydrate: M0ROX9374L
- KEGG: D07427
- CompTox Dashboard (EPA): DTXSID60173946
- ECHA InfoCard: 100.039.559

Chemical and physical data
- Formula: C_{12}H_{10}CaO_{10}S_{2}
- Molar mass: 418.40 g·mol^{−1}
- 3D model (JSmol): Interactive image; monohydrate: Interactive image
- SMILES: [Ca+2].O=S([O-])(=O)c1cc(O)ccc1O.[O-]S(=O)(=O)c1cc(O)ccc1O; monohydrate: O.[Ca++].OC1=CC(=C(O)C=C1)S([O-])(=O)=O.OC1=CC(=C(O)C=C1)S([O-])(=O)=O
- InChI: InChI=1S/2C6H6O5S.Ca/c2*7-4-1-2-5(8)6(3-4)12(9,10)11;/h2*1-3,7-8H,(H,9,10,11);/q;;+2/p-2; Key:QGNBTYAQAPLTMX-UHFFFAOYSA-L; monohydrate: InChI=1S/2C6H6O5S.Ca.H2O/c2*7-4-1-2-5(8)6(3-4)12(9,10)11;;/h2*1-3,7-8H,(H,9,10,11);;1H2/q;;+2;/p-2; Key:JMTQBGBMQZPWCS-UHFFFAOYSA-L

Calcium dobesilate is a vasoprotective. It is the calcium salt of dobesilic acid. It is a synthetic molecule with the ability to reduce capillary permeability in the body. In Switzerland the drug is sold by the pharmaceutical company OM Pharma under the trade name of Doxium in capsules containing 500 mg of active ingredient.

== Chemistry ==
The compound appears as a white hygroscopic powder. Very soluble in water and easily soluble in alcohol, it is practically insoluble in dichloromethane and poorly soluble in isopropyl alcohol. At the concentration of 10% the aqueous solution has a pH of between 4.5 and 6.0.

== Pharmacodynamics ==
The molecule has the property of optimizing the microcirculatory function. In fact, it reduces capillary permeability both by stabilizing the basement membrane for an action on the collagen chains that constitute it, and by interacting with different biochemical mediators that favor endothelial permeability itself. In this way it favors a reduction in blood hyperviscosity and also performs an anti- platelet aggregation action.

== Pharmacokinetics ==
Calcium dobesilate after oral administration is well absorbed from the gastrointestinal tract. Maximum plasma concentrations (C max ) of 6-8 μg/ml are reached approximately six hours after oral administration of 500 mg, which are generally maintained for over 12 hours. In the body the drug is poorly metabolized (less than 10%) and its binding with plasma proteins is rather low. Elimination occurs mainly through excretion from the kidneys.

== Clinical uses ==
Calcium dobesilate is indicated in states of fragility and altered capillary permeability, e.g. diabetic retinopathy, chronic venous disease and hemorrhoidal disease. In combination with lidocaine or with lidocaine and dexamethasone, the drug enters the composition of preparations for the therapy of hemorrhoidal disease. In association with potassium hydrodex-sulfate enters the composition of adjuvant gels in the treatment of varicose veins. The efficacy of calcium dobesilate has been described in patients with microangiopathies such as diabetic retinopathy and diabetic nephropathy.

== Side effects ==
During treatment, gastrointestinal disorders can be observed: dyspepsia, nausea, vomiting, diarrhea . These disorders generally regress with the simple decrease in the dose taken, or with the temporary suspension of the treatment. Other adverse events related to hypersensitivity reactions have also been reported : among these skin rashes, skin rash, fever, arthralgia (joint pain). Rare cases of agranulocytosis have also been reported in medical literature. The rarity of the latter adverse effect led several authors to conclude that perhaps there could have been methodological errors in risk assessments.

== Contraindications ==
The drug is contraindicated in subjects with known hypersensitivity to the active ingredient or to any of the inactive ingredients contained in the pharmaceutical formulation. It is also contraindicated in women who are pregnant and breastfeeding.

== Therapeutic doses ==
Calcium dobesilate is administered orally at a daily dose of 0.5–2 g (equivalent to 1-4 tablets). It can also be administered rectally in the case of hemorrhoidal disease.
