= Sodium apolate =

Vasoprotective

Clinical data
- ATC code: C05BA02 (WHO)

Identifiers
- CAS Number: 25053-27-4
- PubChem CID: 3270262
- ChemSpider: none
- UNII: 9461405D9F
- KEGG: D04825

Chemical and physical data
- Formula: (C_{2}H_{3}NaO_{3}S)_{n}, with n~25

Sodium apolate (INN) or lyapolate sodium (USAN) is a vasoprotective.
