= Dobesilic acid =

Names
- IUPAC name 2,5-Dihydroxybenzenesulfonic acid
- Other names Hydroquinonesulfonic acid

Identifiers
CAS Number	88-46-0
3D model (JSmol)	Interactive image
ChEBI	CHEBI:71157
ChEMBL	ChEMBL1232131
ChemSpider	16554
DrugBank	DB13529
ECHA InfoCard	100.001.667
EC Number	201-833-4
PubChem CID	17507
UNII	TO0PAT081I
CompTox Dashboard (EPA)	DTXSID8045014
- InChI: InChI=1S/C6H6O5S/c7-4-1-2-5(8)6(3-4)12(9,10)11/h1-3,7-8H,(H,9,10,11) Key: IKQCSJBQLWJEPU-UHFFFAOYSA-N
- SMILES: C1=CC(=C(C=C1O)S(=O)(=O)O)O

Properties
Chemical formula	C_{6}H_{6}O_{5}S
Molar mass	190.17 g·mol^{−1}

Related compounds
Other cations	Calcium dobesilate
- Except where otherwise noted, data are given for materials in their standard state (at 25 °C [77 °F], 100 kPa). Infobox references

Dobesilic acid is a chemical compound with the molecular formula C_{6}H_{6}O_{5}S. It is classified as both a phenol and a sulfonic acid.

== Uses ==
Salts of dobesilic are used as pharmaceutical drugs. The calcium salt, calcium dobesilate, is used as a vasoprotective drug. The diethylamine salt, etamsylate, is an antihemorrhagic agent.
