= Hidrosmin =

Chemical compound

Clinical data
- Other names: Venosmil; O-(beta-Hydroxyethyl)diosmin
- AHFS/Drugs.com: International Drug Names
- ATC code: C05CA05 (WHO)

Identifiers
- IUPAC name: 5-(2-hydroxyethoxy)-2-(3-hydroxy-4-methoxyphenyl)-7-[(2S,3R,4S,5S,6R)-3,4,5-trihydroxy-6-[ [(2R,3R,4R,5R,6S)-3,4,5-trihydroxy-6-methyloxan-2-yl]oxymethyl]oxan-2-yl]oxychromen-4-one
- CAS Number: 115960-14-0
- PubChem CID: 3087722
- ChemSpider: 2344126
- UNII: 4I5K8199OQ
- CompTox Dashboard (EPA): DTXSID90151237

Chemical and physical data
- Formula: C_{30}H_{36}O_{16}
- Molar mass: 652.602 g·mol^{−1}
- 3D model (JSmol): Interactive image
- SMILES: O=C\4c5c(OCCO)cc(O[C@@H]2O[C@H](CO[C@@H]1O[C@H]([C@H](O)[C@@H](O)[C@H]1O)C)[C@@H](O)[C@H](O)[C@H]2O)cc5O/C(c3ccc(OC)c(O)c3)=C/4
- InChI: InChI=1S/C30H36O16/c1-12-23(34)25(36)27(38)29(43-12)42-11-21-24(35)26(37)28(39)30(46-21)44-14-8-19(41-6-5-31)22-16(33)10-18(45-20(22)9-14)13-3-4-17(40-2)15(32)7-13/h3-4,7-10,12,21,23-32,34-39H,5-6,11H2,1-2H3/t12-,21+,23-,24+,25+,26-,27+,28+,29+,30+/m0/s1; Key:XYFLWVOTXWXNAM-WTNNCJBMSA-N

Hidrosmin is a flavone, a type of flavonoid. It is a vasoprotective.
