= Troxerutin =

Chemical compound

Clinical data
- Other names: Hydroxyethylrutoside (HER); Pherarutin; Trihydroxyethylrutin; 3',4',7-Tris[O-(2-hydroxyethyl)]rutin
- AHFS/Drugs.com: International Drug Names
- ATC code: C05CA04 (WHO)

Identifiers
- IUPAC name: 2-[3,4-bis(2-hydroxyethoxy)phenyl]-5-hydroxy-7-(2-hydroxyethoxy)-4-oxo-4H-chromen-3-yl 6-O-(6-deoxy-β-D-mannopyranosyl)-β-D-glucopyranoside
- CAS Number: 7085-55-4
- PubChem CID: 9896814
- ChemSpider: 4589027
- UNII: 7Y4N11PXO8
- KEGG: D07180
- ChEMBL: ChEMBL3182320

Chemical and physical data
- Formula: C_{33}H_{42}O_{19}
- Molar mass: 742.680 g·mol^{−1}
- 3D model (JSmol): Interactive image
- SMILES: C[C@H]1[C@@H]([C@H]([C@H]([C@@H](O1)OC[C@@H]2[C@H]([C@@H]([C@H]([C@@H](O2)Oc3c(=O)c4c(cc(cc4oc3c5ccc(c(c5)OCCO)OCCO)OCCO)O)O)O)O)O)O)O
- InChI: InChI=1S/C33H42O19/c1-14-23(38)26(41)28(43)32(49-14)48-13-21-24(39)27(42)29(44)33(51-21)52-31-25(40)22-17(37)11-16(45-7-4-34)12-20(22)50-30(31)15-2-3-18(46-8-5-35)19(10-15)47-9-6-36/h2-3,10-12,14,21,23-24,26-29,32-39,41-44H,4-9,13H2,1H3/t14-,21+,23-,24+,26+,27-,28+,29+,32+,33-/m0/s1; Key:IYVFNTXFRYQLRP-VVSTWUKXSA-N

Troxerutin is a flavonol, a type of flavonoid, derived from rutin. It is more accurately a hydroxyethylrutoside. It can be isolated from Sophora japonica, the Japanese pagoda tree.

It is used as a vasoprotective.

Troxerutin has been shown in mice to reverse CNS insulin resistance and reduce reactive oxygen species induced by a high-cholesterol diet.
