= Monoxerutin =

Chemical compound

Clinical data
- Other names: Rutilemone; Varemoid; Paroven; Relvene; Monoxerutinum; Monoxerutina; Monoxerutine
- ATC code: C05CA02 (WHO)

Identifiers
- IUPAC name: 2-(3,4-dihydroxyphenyl)-5-hydroxy-7-(2-hydroxyethoxy)-3-[(3R,4S,5S,6R)-3,4,5-trihydroxy-6-[[(3R,4R,5R,6S)-3,4,5-trihydroxy-6-methyloxan-2-yl]oxymethyl]oxan-2-yl]oxychromen-4-one
- CAS Number: 23869-24-1
- PubChem CID: 9852585
- ChemSpider: 8028296
- UNII: EKF7043SBU
- KEGG: D07179
- CompTox Dashboard (EPA): DTXSID70905139
- ECHA InfoCard: 100.041.729

Chemical and physical data
- Formula: C_{29}H_{34}O_{17}
- Molar mass: 654.574 g·mol^{−1}
- 3D model (JSmol): Interactive image
- SMILES: C[C@H]1[C@@H]([C@H]([C@H]([C@@H](O1)OC[C@@H]2[C@H]([C@@H]([C@H]([C@@H](O2)OC3=C(OC4=CC(=CC(=C4C3=O)O)OCCO)C5=CC(=C(C=C5)O)O)O)O)O)O)O)O
- InChI: InChI=1S/C29H34O17/c1-10-19(34)22(37)24(39)28(43-10)42-9-17-20(35)23(38)25(40)29(45-17)46-27-21(36)18-15(33)7-12(41-5-4-30)8-16(18)44-26(27)11-2-3-13(31)14(32)6-11/h2-3,6-8,10,17,19-20,22-25,28-35,37-40H,4-5,9H2,1H3/t10-,17+,19-,20+,22+,23-,24+,25+,28+,29-/m0/s1; Key:MBHXKZDTQCSVPM-BDAFLREQSA-N

Monoxerutin is a flavonol, a type of flavonoid. It is more accurately a hydroxyethylrutoside.
