= SYT1 =

Protein-coding gene in the species Homo sapiens

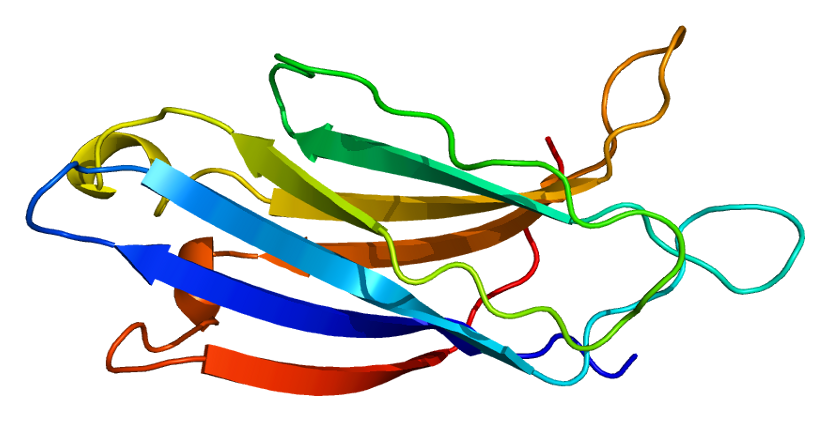

Identifiers
- Aliases: SYT1, P65, SVP65, SYT, synaptotagmin 1, BAGOS
- External IDs: OMIM: 185605; MGI: 99667; GeneCards: SYT1
Available structures
PDB	Ortholog search: PDBe RCSB
PDB	List of PDB id codes 2K45, 2K4A, 2K8M, 2KI6, 2LHA, 2N1T, 2R83, 3F00, 3F01, 3F04, 3F05, 4ISQ, 4V11

Gene location (Human)
Chr.	Chromosome 12 (human)
Band	12q21.2	Start	78,863,993 bp
Band	12q21.2	End	79,452,008 bp

Gene location (Mouse)
Chr.	Chromosome 10 (mouse)
Band	10 D1|10 56.52 cM	Start	108,333,511 bp
Band	10 D1|10 56.52 cM	End	108,846,843 bp
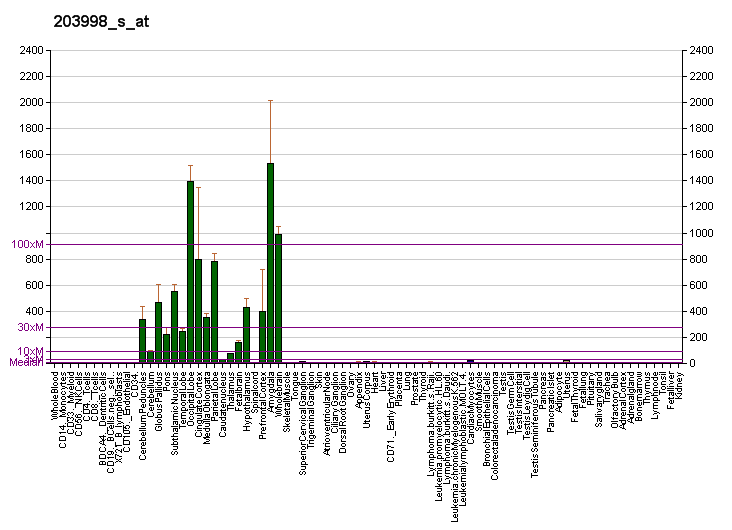

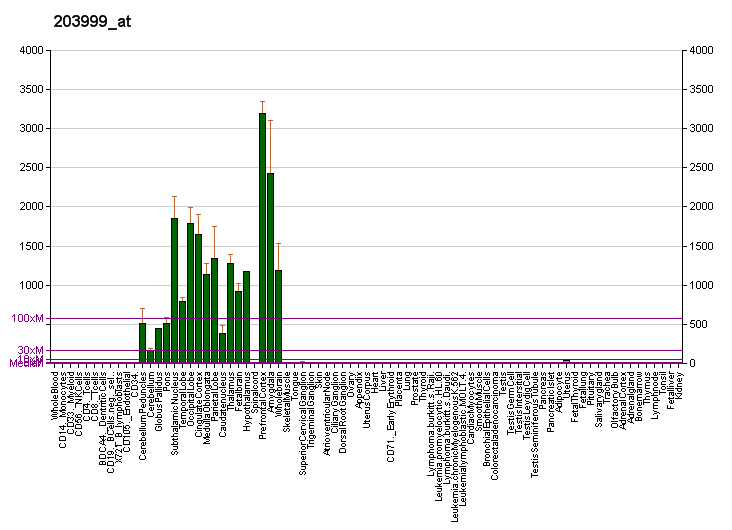
RNA expression pattern
Bgee	Human / Mouse (ortholog); Top expressed in: middle temporal gyrus; Brodmann area 23; endothelial cell; lateral nuclear group of thalamus; orbitofrontal cortex; frontal pole; superior frontal gyrus; pons; Brodmann area 10; cerebellar vermis / Top expressed in: medial dorsal nucleus; subiculum; medial geniculate nucleus; superior frontal gyrus; dentate gyrus of hippocampal formation granule cell; lateral geniculate nucleus; lateral septal nucleus; primary motor cortex; primary visual cortex; neural layer of retina; More reference expression data
BioGPS	More reference expression data
Gene ontology
Molecular function	protein C-terminus binding; metal ion binding; phosphatidylinositol-4,5-bisphosphate binding; calcium ion binding; clathrin binding; identical protein binding; calcium-dependent protein binding; phospholipid binding; SNARE binding; calmodulin binding; 1-phosphatidylinositol binding; phosphatidylserine binding; low-density lipoprotein particle receptor binding; syntaxin binding; protein binding; syntaxin-1 binding; calcium-dependent phospholipid binding; syntaxin-3 binding; protein heterodimerization activity; calcium ion sensor activity
Cellular component	terminal bouton; SNARE complex; clathrin-sculpted glutamate transport vesicle membrane; intracellular organelle; cytoplasm; transport vesicle membrane; synapse; integral component of membrane; Golgi apparatus; cell junction; clathrin-sculpted gamma-aminobutyric acid transport vesicle membrane; presynaptic membrane; dense core granule; clathrin-sculpted monoamine transport vesicle membrane; neuron projection; chromaffin granule membrane; membrane; excitatory synapse; synaptic vesicle; secretory granule; clathrin-sculpted acetylcholine transport vesicle membrane; cytoplasmic vesicle; synaptic vesicle membrane; plasma membrane; integral component of synaptic vesicle membrane; axon; clathrin-coated vesicle membrane; neuron projection terminus; exocytic vesicle; hippocampal mossy fiber to CA3 synapse; glutamatergic synapse
Biological process	detection of calcium ion; positive regulation of vesicle fusion; chemical synaptic transmission; synaptic vesicle exocytosis; positive regulation of calcium ion-dependent exocytosis; response to calcium ion; regulation of regulated secretory pathway; brain development; glutamate secretion; positive regulation of dendrite extension; positive regulation of synaptic transmission; regulation of synaptic transmission, glutamatergic; regulation of exocytosis; synaptic vesicle endocytosis; vesicle docking; cell differentiation; fast, calcium ion-dependent exocytosis of neurotransmitter; neurotransmitter secretion; cellular response to calcium ion; vesicle fusion; regulation of calcium ion-dependent exocytosis; calcium ion-regulated exocytosis of neurotransmitter; regulation of dopamine secretion; protein homooligomerization; protein heterooligomerization; membrane organization; vesicle-mediated transport; calcium-ion regulated exocytosis; calcium-dependent activation of synaptic vesicle fusion; spontaneous neurotransmitter secretion; synchronous neurotransmitter secretion; regulation of synaptic vesicle exocytosis; positive regulation of calcium ion-dependent exocytosis of neurotransmitter
Sources:Amigo / QuickGO
Orthologs
Databases	NCBI: entry; OMA: entry
Species	Human	Mouse
Entrez	6857	20979
Ensembl	ENSG00000067715	ENSMUSG00000035864
UniProt	P21579	P46096
RefSeq (mRNA)	NM_001135805; NM_001135806; NM_001291901; NM_005639	NM_001252341; NM_001252342; NM_009306; NM_001358501; NM_001358502 NM_001358503; NM_001358504; NM_001358506
RefSeq (protein)	NP_001129277; NP_001129278; NP_001278830; NP_005630	NP_001239270; NP_001239271; NP_033332; NP_001345430; NP_001345431 NP_001345432; NP_001345433; NP_001345435
Location (UCSC)	Chr 12: 78.86 – 79.45 Mb	Chr 10: 108.33 – 108.85 Mb
PubMed search
- Wikidata
View/Edit Human	View/Edit Mouse

Synaptotagmin-1 is a protein that in humans is encoded by the SYT1 gene.

== Function ==
Synaptotagmins are integral membrane proteins of synaptic vesicles thought to serve as sensors for calcium ions (Ca^{2+}) in the process of vesicular trafficking and exocytosis. Calcium ion binding to synaptotagmin I participates in triggering neurotransmitter release at the synapse. [Supplied by OMIM]

SYT1 is the master switch responsible for allowing the human brain to release neurotransmitters. SYT1 senses calcium ion concentrations as low as 10 ppm and subsequently signals the SNARE complex to open fusion pores.

== Interactions ==
SYT1 has been shown to interact with SNAP-25, STX1A and S100A13.

== Clinical Significance ==
Mutations in the SYT1 gene cause a rare neurodevelopmental disorder known as SYT1-associated neurodevelopmental disorder (or Baker-Gordon Syndrome).
