= Polidocanol =

Chemical compound

Clinical data
- Other names: Polydocanol; Laureth 9; Macrogol lauryl ether; Lauromacrogol; PEG-9 lauryl alcohol; POE-9 lauryl alcohol; Dodecylpolyethyleneglycolether; Hydroxyl polyethoxy dodecane; Oxypolyethoxydodecane
- AHFS/Drugs.com: International Drug Names
- Pregnancy category: Topical: allowed Injection: contraindication in months 1–3 and after week 36
- Routes of administration: topical, subcutaneous injection
- ATC code: C05BB02 (WHO)

Legal status
- Legal status: CA: ℞-only; OTC (topical), Rx (injection)

Identifiers
- IUPAC name: 3,6,9,12,15,18,21,24,27-nonaoxanonatriacontan-1-ol
- CAS Number: 9002-92-0 3055-99-0
- PubChem CID: 656641
- DrugBank: DB06811
- ChemSpider: 570993
- UNII: 0AWH8BFG9A
- KEGG: D01993
- ChEMBL: ChEMBL1201751
- CompTox Dashboard (EPA): DTXSID5039721
- ECHA InfoCard: 100.019.351

Chemical and physical data
- Formula: C_{30}H_{62}O_{10}
- Molar mass: 582.816 g·mol^{−1}
- 3D model (JSmol): Interactive image
- SMILES: CCCCCCCCCCCCOCCOCCOCCOCCOCCOCCOCCOCCOCCO
- InChI: InChI=1S/C30H62O10/c1-2-3-4-5-6-7-8-9-10-11-13-32-15-17-34-19-21-36-23-25-38-27-29-40-30-28-39-26-24-37-22-20-35-18-16-33-14-12-31/h31H,2-30H2,1H3; Key:ONJQDTZCDSESIW-UHFFFAOYSA-N

Polidocanol is a local anaesthetic and antipruritic component of ointments and bath additives. It relieves itching caused by eczema and dry skin. It has also been used to treat varicose veins, hemangiomas, and vascular malformations. It is formed by the ethoxylation of dodecanol.

== Sclerotherapy ==
Polidocanol is also used as a sclerosant, an irritant injected to treat varicose veins, under the trade names Asclera, Aethoxysklerol and Varithena. Polidocanol causes fibrosis inside varicose veins, occluding the lumen of the vessel, and reducing the appearance of the varicosity.

The FDA has approved polidocanol injections for the treatment of small varicose (less than 1 mm in diameter) and reticular veins (1 to 3 mm in diameter). Polidocanol works by damaging the cell lining of blood vessels, causing them to close and eventually be replaced by other types of tissue. Polidocanol in the form of Varithena injected in the greater saphenous vein can cause the eruption of varicose and spider veins throughout the lower leg. This procedure should be done with caution and with the knowledge that the appearance of the leg may be forever compromised.

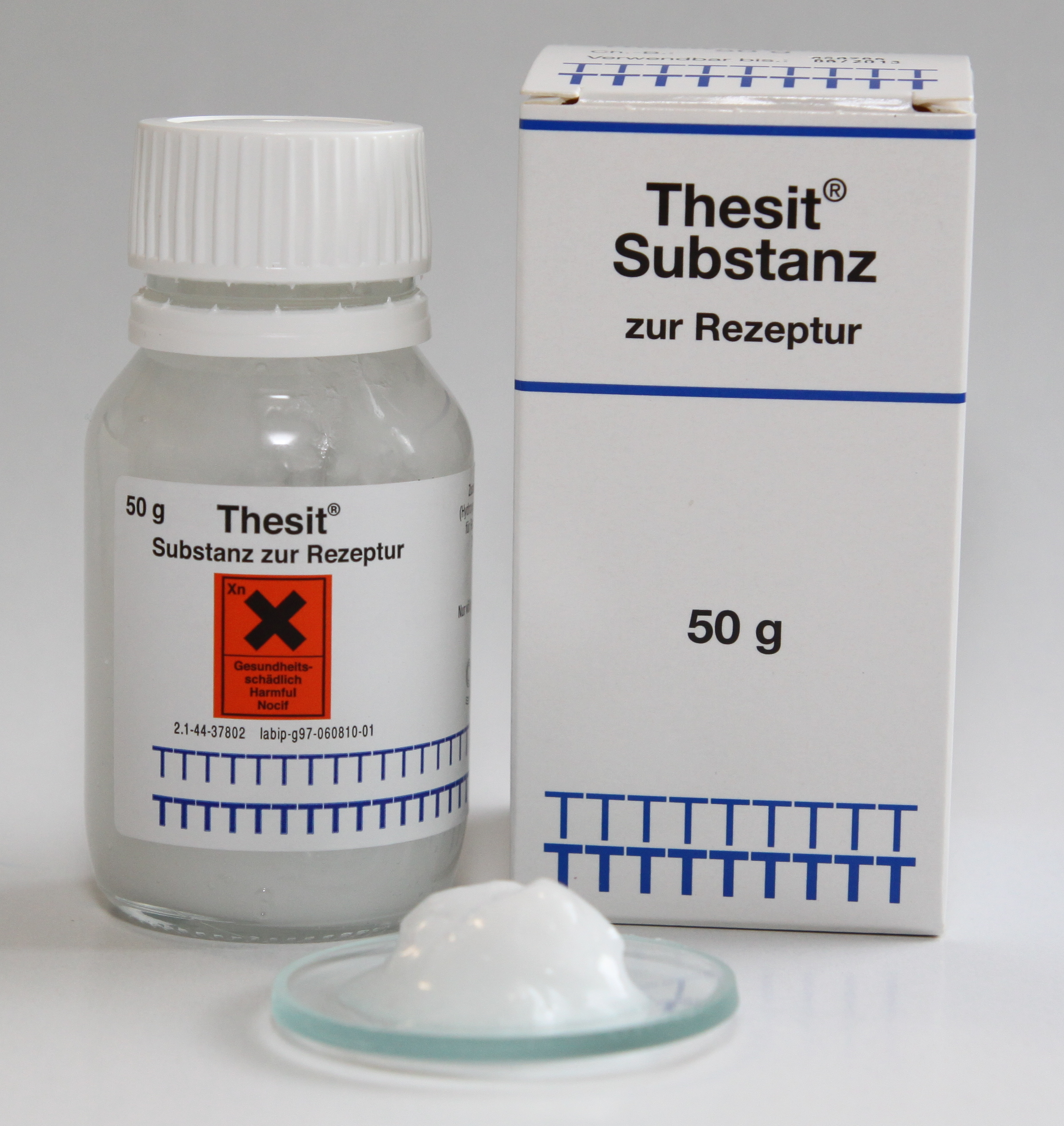
Pure polidocanol for pharmaceutical use
