= Tribenoside =

Chemical compound

Clinical data
- Other names: (3R,4R,5R)-4-(Benzyloxy)-5-[1,2-bis(benzyloxy)ethyl]-2-ethoxyoxolan-3-ol
- AHFS/Drugs.com: International Drug Names
- ATC code: C05AX05 (WHO) C05CX01 (WHO)

Identifiers
- IUPAC name: Ethyl 3,5,6-tri-O-benzyl-D-glucofuranoside (TBGF)
- CAS Number: 10310-32-4
- PubChem CID: 196122
- ChemSpider: 169970
- UNII: Z7N0Y673NU
- ChEMBL: ChEMBL1446743
- CompTox Dashboard (EPA): DTXSID7023697
- ECHA InfoCard: 100.030.612

Chemical and physical data
- Formula: C_{29}H_{34}O_{6}
- Molar mass: 478.585 g·mol^{−1}
- 3D model (JSmol): Interactive image
- SMILES: CCOC1[C@@H]([C@H]([C@H](O1)[C@@H](COCc2ccccc2)OCc3ccccc3)OCc4ccccc4)O
- InChI: InChI=1S/C29H34O6/c1-2-32-29-26(30)28(34-20-24-16-10-5-11-17-24)27(35-29)25(33-19-23-14-8-4-9-15-23)21-31-18-22-12-6-3-7-13-22/h3-17,25-30H,2,18-21H2,1H3/t25-,26-,27-,28-,29?/m1/s1; Key:ULLNJSBQMBKOJH-VIVFLBMVSA-N

Tribenoside (Glyvenol) is a vasoprotective drug used to treat hemorrhoids. It has mild anti-inflammatory, analgesic, and wound healing properties. Tribenoside stimulates laminin α5 production and laminin-332 deposition to help repair the basement membrane during the wound healing process. It is a mixture of the α- and β-anomers.

Tribenoside has been shown to induce drug hypersensitivity syndrome in association with CMV reactivation.
