= Pentosan =

Polysaccharide

Pentosans are polymers composed of pentoses. In contrast to cellulose, which is composed of hexose (glucose) monomers, pentosans are derived from five-carbon sugars such as xylose. Pentosan-rich biomass is the precursor to furfural.

The pentosan content has been determined for many natural materials:

- 29-25%: oat hulls, cottonseed hulls, barley, sugarcane bagasse, sunflower husks
- 24-20% wheat straw, flax shives, hazelnut shells, birchwood, eucalyptus wood
- 8% pinewood
- 3% peanut shells

Pentosans can act as heparinoids, glycosaminoglycans which are derivatives of heparin.

They can have an influence on bread quality.

== See also ==
- Pentosan polysulfate, a semi-synthetic polysulfated xylan sold for the relief of various medical conditions including thrombi and interstitial cystitis in humans and osteoarthritis in dogs and horses
