= ATC code C05 =

ATC code C05 Vasoprotectives is a therapeutic subgroup of the Anatomical Therapeutic Chemical Classification System, a system of alphanumeric codes developed by the World Health Organization (WHO) for the classification of drugs and other medical products. Subgroup C05 is part of the anatomical group C Cardiovascular system.

Codes for veterinary use (ATCvet codes) can be created by placing the letter Q in front of the human ATC code: for example, QC05.
National versions of the ATC classification may include additional codes not present in this list, which follows the WHO version.

== C05A Agents for treatment of hemorrhoids and anal fissures for topical use ==
=== C05AA Corticosteroids ===
C05AA01 Hydrocortisone
C05AA04 Prednisolone
C05AA05 Betamethasone
C05AA06 Fluorometholone
C05AA08 Fluocortolone
C05AA09 Dexamethasone
C05AA10 Fluocinolone acetonide
C05AA11 Fluocinonide
C05AA12 Triamcinolone

=== C05AD Local anesthetics ===
C05AD01 Lidocaine
C05AD02 Tetracaine
C05AD03 Benzocaine
C05AD04 Cinchocaine
C05AD05 Procaine
C05AD06 Oxetacaine
C05AD07 Pramocaine

=== C05AE Muscle relaxants ===
C05AE01 Glyceryl trinitrate
C05AE02 Isosorbide dinitrate
C05AE03 Diltiazem

=== C05AX Other agents for treatment of hemorrhoids and anal fissures for topical use ===
C05AX01 Aluminium preparations
C05AX02 Bismuth preparations, combinations
C05AX03 Other preparations, combinations
C05AX04 Zinc preparations
C05AX05 Tribenoside
C05AX06 Phenylephrine

== C05B Antivaricose therapy ==
=== C05BA Heparins or heparinoids for topical use ===
C05BA01 Organo-heparinoid
C05BA02 Sodium apolate
C05BA03 Heparin
C05BA04 Pentosan polysulfate sodium
C05BA51 Heparinoid, combinations
C05BA53 Heparin, combinations

=== C05BB Sclerosing agents for local injection ===
C05BB01 Monoethanolamine oleate
C05BB02 Polidocanol
C05BB03 Invert sugar
C05BB04 Sodium tetradecyl sulfate
C05BB05 Phenol
C05BB56 Glucose, combinations

=== C05BX Other sclerosing agents ===
C05BX01 Calcium dobesilate
C05BX51 Calcium dobesilate, combinations

== C05C Capillary stabilising agents ==
=== C05CA Bioflavonoids ===
C05CA01 Rutoside
C05CA02 Monoxerutin
C05CA03 Diosmin
C05CA04 Troxerutin
C05CA05 Hidrosmin
C05CA51 Rutoside, combinations
C05CA53 Diosmin, combinations
C05CA54 Troxerutin, combinations

=== C05CX Other capillary stabilising agents ===
C05CX01 Tribenoside
C05CX02 Naftazone
C05CX03 Hippocastani semen

=== C05XX Other vasoprotectives ===
C05XX01 Beperminogene perplasmid
