= Etamsylate =

Chemical compound used as an antihemorrhagic

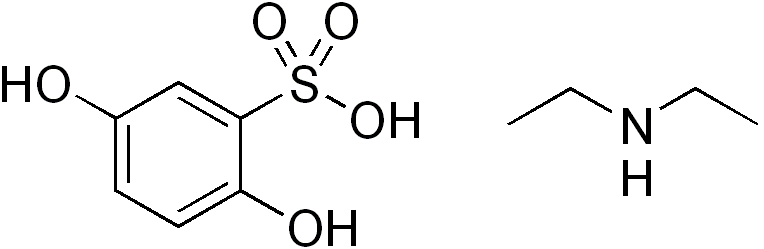

Clinical data
- Trade names: Cyclonamine, Dicynene, Dicynone, Haemostop, Menostat
- Other names: Diethylammonium 2,5-dihydroxybenzenesulfonate; diethylammonium dobesilate
- AHFS/Drugs.com: International Drug Names
- ATC code: B02BX01 (WHO)

Identifiers
- IUPAC name: 2,5-Dihydroxybenzenesulfonic acid; N-ethylethanamine
- CAS Number: 2624-44-4
- PubChem CID: 17506
- ChemSpider: 16553
- UNII: 24YL531VOH
- KEGG: D01282
- CompTox Dashboard (EPA): DTXSID4045559
- ECHA InfoCard: 100.018.265

Chemical and physical data
- Formula: C_{10}H_{17}NO_{5}S
- Molar mass: 263.31 g·mol^{−1}
- 3D model (JSmol): Interactive image
- SMILES: CCNCC.c1cc(c(cc1O)S(=O)(=O)O)O
- InChI: InChI=1S/C6H6O5S.C4H11N/c7-4-1-2-5(8)6(3-4)12(9,10)11;1-3-5-4-2/h1-3,7-8H,(H,9,10,11);5H,3-4H2,1-2H3; Key:HBGOLJKPSFNJSD-UHFFFAOYSA-N

Etamsylate (sometimes spelled ethamsylate) is an antihemorrhagic agent which is believed to work by increasing resistance in the endothelium of capillaries and promoting platelet adhesion. It also inhibits biosynthesis and action of those prostaglandins which cause platelet disaggregation, vasodilation and increased capillary permeability.

Etamsylate is the salt of dobesilic acid and diethylamine.

== Indications ==
Prophylaxis and control of haemorrhages from small blood vessels, neonatal intraventricular haemorrhage, capillary bleeding of different etiology, including: menorrhagia and metrorrhagia without organic pathology, after trans-urethral resection of the prostate, hematemesis, melena, hematuria, epistaxis; secondary bleeding due to thrombocytopenia or thrombocytopathia, hypocoagulation, prevention of periventricular hemorrhages in prematurely born children.

== Mechanism of action ==
Etamsylate is a haemostatic agent; also promotes angioprotective and proaggregant action. It stimulates thrombopoiesis and their release from bone marrow. Haemostatic action is due to activation of thromboplastin formation on damaged sites of small blood vessels and decrease of PgI2 (Prostacyclin) synthesis; it also facilitates platelet aggregation and adhesion, that at last induce decrease and stop of hemorrhage.

The precise mechanism of action of etamsylate is unknown. It has been shown to reduce bleeding time and blood loss from wounds. This appears to relate to increased platelet aggregation mediated by a thromboxane A2 or prostaglandin F2a dependent mechanism. It has also been associated with decreased concentrations of 6-oxoprostaglandin F1a, a stable metabolite of prostacyclin. Prostacyclin is a potent vasodilator, and may be implicated in reperfusion; it is also a disaggregator of platelets. Whereas prostaglandins themselves may have a role in regulating cerebral blood flow, etamsylate appears to have no effect on cerebral blood flow. Etamsylate was also thought to stabilize capillaries, reinforcing capillary membranes by polymerizing hyaluronic acid.

Etamsylate limits capillary bleeding through its action on hyaluronic acid and initial studies showed a reduction in intraventricular haemorrhage.

Etamsylate may also have an effect on the microcirculation, encouraging platelet aggregation and vasoconstriction and therefore haemostasis. It also inhibits the effects of the prostaglandin mediated vasodilatation and increased capillary permeability, thereby reducing oedema secondary to capillary leakage. It is also possible that etamsylate would reduce reperfusion haemorrhage in ischaemic areas of the brain, preventing secondary damage.

By inhibiting the effects of prostaglandins, etamsylate may exert an effect by closing the patent ductus and thereby increasing cerebral blood flow. Further, etamsylate has demonstrated interference with heparin, antagonizing its pro-hemorrhagic and anti-coagulant effects, without inhibiting its vasodilatory properties.

== Veterinary use ==
In July 2025, the Committee for Veterinary Medicinal Products of the European Medicines Agency adopted a positive opinion, recommending the granting of a marketing authorization for the veterinary medicinal product Hemosyvet, solution for injection, intended for cats, cattle, dogs, goats, horses, pigs, and sheep. The applicant for this veterinary medicinal product is Axience. Hemosyvet is an hemostatic and angio-protective medicinal product containing etamsylate as the active substance which stimulates platelet adhesiveness, shortening bleeding time, and rapidly and lastingly normalizes the altered vascular fragility and permeability.
