= Sodium tetradecyl sulfate =

Anionic surfactant in common use

Clinical data
- Other names: 7-Ethyl-2-methyl-4-hendecanol sulfate sodium salt
- AHFS/Drugs.com: Consumer Drug Information
- Routes of administration: Intravenous injection
- ATC code: C05BB04 (WHO)

Legal status
- Legal status: In general: ℞ (Prescription only)

Identifiers
- IUPAC name: Sodium 7-ethyl-2-methyl-4-undecanyl sulfate
- CAS Number: 139-88-8
- PubChem CID: 14492
- ChemSpider: 8440
- UNII: Q1SUG5KBD6
- ChEMBL: ChEMBL1200354
- CompTox Dashboard (EPA): DTXSID3041530
- ECHA InfoCard: 100.004.892

Chemical and physical data
- Formula: C_{14}H_{29}NaO_{4}S
- Molar mass: 316.43 g·mol^{−1}
- 3D model (JSmol): Interactive image
- SMILES: CCCCC(CC)CCC(CC(C)C)OS(=O)(=O)[O-].[Na+]
- InChI: InChI=1S/C14H30O4S.Na/c1-5-7-8-13(6-2)9-10-14(11-12(3)4)18-19(15,16)17;/h12-14H,5-11H2,1-4H3,(H,15,16,17);/q;+1/p-1; Key:FVEFRICMTUKAML-UHFFFAOYSA-M

Sodium tetradecyl sulfate (STS), is a common anionic surfactant. The compound consists of the sodium salt of the micelle-forming sulfate ester of 7-Ethyl-2-methyl-4-undecanol. It is a white, water-soluble solid of low toxicity with many practical uses.

== Applications ==
=== Medicine ===
It the active component of the sclerosant drugs Sotradecol and Fibrovein. It is commonly used in the treatment of varicose and spider veins of the leg, during the procedure of sclerotherapy. Being a detergent, its action is on the lipid molecules in the cells of the vein wall, causing inflammatory destruction of the internal lining of the vein and thrombus formation eventually leading to sclerosis of the vein. It is used in concentrations ranging from 0.1% to 3% for this purpose.

It is occasionally used for the treatment of stabilisation of joints that regularly dislocate, particularly in patients with Ehlers–Danlos syndrome. In the UK, Ireland, Italy, Australia, New Zealand and South Africa, it is sold under the trade-name Fibro-Vein in concentrations of 0.2%, 0.5%, 1.0%, and 3%.

== Synthesis ==
Tetradecyl alcohol is treated with sulfur trioxide followed by neutralization of the resulting pyrosulfuric acid with sodium hydroxide.
