= SYT1-associated neurodevelopmental disorder =

- Other names: Baker-Gordon syndrome
- Specialty: Medical genetics, neurology

SYT1-associated neurodevelopmental disorder, also known as Baker-Gordon syndrome, is a rare genetic disorder caused by mutations in the synaptotagmin-1 (SYT1) gene.

== Signs and symptoms ==
Patients present with neurodevelopmental impairments and symptoms including:

- Infantile hypotonia
- Congenital ophthalmic abnormalities
- Childhood onset hyperkinetic movement disorder
- Stereotypical motor behaviour
- Moderate to profound developmental delay or intellectual disability
- Sleep disturbance
- Episodic agitation

Epileptic seizures are not a feature of this disorder (despite abnormal EEG) and head circumference is typically normal.

== Genetics ==
This condition is caused by heterozygous mutations in the SYT1 gene, located on the long arm of chromosome 12 (12q21.2), which are inherited in an autosomal dominant fashion.

== Pathogenesis ==
Synaptotagmin-1 is a predominantly presynaptic Ca^{2+}-sensor involved in synaptic vesicle exocytosis and endocytosis. In SYT1-associated neurodevelopmental disorder, mutations disrupt synaptotagmin-1 function causing a reduction in neurotransmitter release.

== Diagnosis ==
This disorder may be suspected on the basis of the clinical features listed above and abnormal EEG recording. Diagnosis is made through genetic testing with sequencing of the SYT1 gene.

== Management ==
At present, only supportive management of symptoms is available as there is no known curative treatment for this condition.

== History ==
The first case of SYT1-associated neurodevelopmental disorder was described in 2015 and it was classified as a syndrome in 2018. It was named after Sarah Gordon and Kate Baker, who first discovered and described it.
