= Hydroxyethylrutoside =

Chemical compound

Hydroxyethylrutosidesis (oxerutins, O-beta-hydroxyethyl-rutosides, HR, or HER) are hydroxyethyl derivatives of rutosides. Examples include:

- Troxerutin
- Monoxerutin
- Dihydroxyethylrutoside
- Tetrahydroxyethylrutoside

Oxerutins are semisynthetic derivatives of plant constituents. Although they are closely related to the natural flavonoid rutin, hydroxyethylrutosides are not found in food. The only way to take them is in a supplement.

== Health benefits ==
Relvène (1967 French version), Venoruton (1962 Swiss version), and Paroven are mixtures of hydroxyethyl rutinosides. Hydroxyethylrutosides are used in the treatment of chronic venous insufficiency and hypertensive microangiopathy. Oxerutins work by reducing leakage from the small blood vessels (capillaries).

Hydroxyethylrutosides have been used as an alternative to horse chestnut preparations (venostasin) containing aescin. Typical doses are in the order of 1,000 mg/day.

Effects of hydroxyethylrutosides against adriamycin-induced toxicity have been investigated in rats.
