= Near-infrared vein finder =

Electronic device used to find veins in the human body

A labelled diagram of the major arteries and veins of the human body.

Near-infrared vein finder are medical devices used to try to increase the ability of healthcare providers to see veins. They use near-infrared light reflection to create a map of the veins. The received imagery is then either displayed on a screen or projected back onto the patient's skin.

They may not increase the success of starting intravenous catheters in children, since the difficulty may arise not in locating the vessel, but in physical manipulation of the needle.

Nurses and other healthcare practitioners can easily pass IV cannula and other parenteral dosage with the help of a vein finder.

Luminetx introduced a device called VeinViewer in 2006, and Accuvein introduced a product called Accuvein in 2008. The machines in the United States cost about $15,000 as of 2015. Christie Medical Holdings introduced the VeinViewer Flex.
