= Tetraspanin 9 =

Protein-coding gene in the species Homo sapiens

TSPAN9

Identifiers
- Aliases: TSPAN9, NET-5, NET5, PP1057, tetraspanin 9
- External IDs: OMIM: 613137; MGI: 1924558; GeneCards: TSPAN9

Gene location (Human)
Chr.	Chromosome 12 (human)
Band	12p13.33-p13.32	Start	3,077,355 bp
Band	12p13.33-p13.32	End	3,286,564 bp

Gene location (Mouse)
Chr.	Chromosome 6 (mouse)
Band	6|6 F3	Start	127,938,359 bp
Band	6|6 F3	End	128,120,557 bp
RNA expression pattern
Bgee	Human / Mouse (ortholog); Top expressed in: apex of heart; cerebellar hemisphere; right hemisphere of cerebellum; right auricle of heart; left ventricle; right lung; right lobe of liver; stromal cell of endometrium; vena cava; gallbladder / Top expressed in: gastrula; yolk sac; cerebellar cortex; endothelial cell of lymphatic vessel; decidua; internal carotid artery; lip; right lung; iris; external carotid artery; More reference expression data
BioGPS	n/a
Gene ontology
Molecular function	molecular function
Cellular component	integral component of membrane; plasma membrane; tetraspanin-enriched microdomain; integral component of plasma membrane; membrane; focal adhesion
Biological process	cell surface receptor signaling pathway; biological process
Sources:Amigo / QuickGO
Orthologs
Databases	NCBI: entry; OMA: entry
Species	Human	Mouse
Entrez	10867	109246
Ensembl	ENSG00000011105	ENSMUSG00000030352
UniProt	O75954	Q8BJU2
RefSeq (mRNA)	NM_001168320; NM_006675	NM_175414; NM_001356301; NM_001379133; NM_001379134; NM_001379135 NM_001379136
RefSeq (protein)	NP_001161792; NP_006666	NP_780623; NP_001343230; NP_001366062; NP_001366063; NP_001366064 NP_001366065
Location (UCSC)	Chr 12: 3.08 – 3.29 Mb	Chr 6: 127.94 – 128.12 Mb
PubMed search
- Wikidata
View/Edit Human	View/Edit Mouse

Tetraspanin 9 is a protein that in humans is encoded by the TSPAN9 gene.

== Function ==
The protein encoded by this gene is a member of the transmembrane 4 superfamily, also known as the tetraspanin family. Most of these members are cell-surface proteins that are characterized by the presence of four hydrophobic domains. The proteins mediate signal transduction events that play a role in the regulation of cell development, activation, growth and motility. Alternatively spliced transcripts encoding the same protein have been identified. [provided by RefSeq, Nov 2009].
