= Sclerotherapy =

Procedure to treat vascular anomalies

- A malformed blood vessel. The needle (1) inserts a sclerosant (2) that causes a controlled inflammatory response
- ICD-9-CM: 39.92
- MeSH: D015911

Sclerotherapy (the word reflects the Greek skleros, meaning hard) is a procedure used to treat blood vessel malformations (vascular malformations) and also malformations of the lymphatic system. A medication is injected into the vessels, which makes them shrink. It is used for children and young adults with vascular or lymphatic malformations. In adults, sclerotherapy is often used to treat spider veins, smaller varicose veins, hemorrhoids, and hydroceles.

Sclerotherapy is one method for the treatment of spider veins, varicose veins (which are also often treated with surgery, radiofrequency, and laser ablation), and venous malformations. In ultrasound-guided sclerotherapy, ultrasound is used to visualize the underlying vein so the physician can deliver and monitor the injection. Sclerotherapy often takes place under ultrasound guidance after venous abnormalities have been diagnosed with duplex ultrasound. Sclerotherapy under ultrasound guidance and using microfoam sclerosants has been shown in a literature reviewed paper published by the American Vein and Lymphatic Society to be effective in controlling reflux from the sapheno-femoral and sapheno-popliteal junctions. However, some authors believe that sclerotherapy is not suitable for veins with reflux from the greater or lesser saphenous junction, or for veins with axial reflux. This is due to the emergence of more effective technologies, including laser ablation and radiofrequency, which have demonstrated superior efficacy to sclerotherapy for treatment of these veins.

== Historical aspects ==
Sclerotherapy has been used in the treatment of spider veins and occasionally varicose veins for over 150 years. Like varicose vein surgery, sclerotherapy techniques have evolved during that time. Modern techniques including ultrasonographic guidance and foam sclerotherapy are the latest developments in this evolution.

The first reported attempt at sclerotherapy was by D Zollikofer in Switzerland in 1682, who injected an acid into a vein to induce thrombus formation. Both Debout and Cassaignaic reported success in treating varicose veins by injecting perchlorate of iron in 1853. Desgranges in 1854 cured 16 cases of varicose veins by injecting iodine and tannin into the veins. This was approximately 12 years after the probable advent of great saphenous vein stripping in 1844 by Madelung. However, due to high rates of side-effects with the drugs used at the time, sclerotherapy had been practically abandoned by 1894. With the improvements in surgical techniques and anaesthetics over that time, stripping became the treatment of choice.

Work continued on alternative sclerosants in the early 20th century. During that time carbolic acid and perchlorate of mercury were tried and whilst these showed some effect in obliterating varicose veins, side-effects also caused them to be abandoned. Prof. Sicard and other French doctors developed the use of sodium carbonate and then sodium salicylate during and after the First World War. Quinine was also used with some effect during the early 20th century. At the time of Coppleson's book in 1929, he was advocating the use of sodium salicylate or quinine as the best choices of sclerosant.

Further work on improving the technique and development of safer more effective sclerosants continued through the 1940s and 1950s. Of particular importance was the development of sodium tetradecyl sulfate (STS) in 1946, a product still widely used to this day. George Fegan in the 1960s reported treating over 13,000 patients with sclerotherapy, significantly advancing the technique by focussing on fibrosis of the vein rather than thrombosis, concentrating on controlling significant points of reflux and emphasizing the importance of compression of the treated leg. The procedure became medically accepted in mainland Europe during that time. However, it was poorly understood or accepted in England or the United States, a situation that continues to this day amongst some sections of the medical community.

The next major development in the evolution of sclerotherapy was the advent of duplex ultrasonography in the 1980s and its incorporation into the practise of sclerotherapy later that decade. Knight was an early advocate of this new procedure and presented it at several conferences in Europe and the United States. Thibault's article was the first on this topic to be published in a peer-reviewed journal.

The work of Cabrera and Monfreaux in utilising foam sclerotherapy along with Tessari's "3-way tap method" of foam production further revolutionised the treatment of larger varicose veins with sclerotherapy. This has now been further modified by Whiteley and Patel to use 3 non-silicone syringes for more long lasting foam.

== Methods ==
Injecting the unwanted veins with a sclerosing solution causes the target vein to immediately shrink, and then dissolve over a period of weeks as the body naturally absorbs the treated vein. The initial "shrinkage" is caused by spasm of the muscular layer of the vein wall. The sclerosing solution damages the vein wall, causing inflammation and gradual scarring ("sclerosis") over the following weeks. The sclerosis is caused by an increase in fibroblasts in the cell wall which causes contraction of the vein. The process requires carefully assessing the strength of the sclerosing solution so it is strong enough to cause a clinically significant effect in the target vein without causing excessive damage to surrounding tissues. Sclerotherapy is a non-invasive procedure taking only about 10 minutes to perform. The downtime is minimal, in comparison to an invasive varicose vein surgery.

Sclerotherapy is the "gold standard" and is preferred over laser for eliminating large spider veins telangiectasias. [Telangiectasia is a condition in which broken or widened small blood vessels that sit near the surface of the skin or mucous membranes create visible], and smaller varicose leg veins. Unlike a laser, the sclerosing solution additionally closes the reticular veins also known as feeder veins under the skin that are causing the spider veins to form, thereby making a recurrence of the spider veins in the treated area less likely. Multiple injections of dilute sclerosant are injected into the abnormal surface veins of the involved leg. The patient's leg is then compressed with either stockings or bandages that they wear usually for one week after treatment. Patients are also encouraged to walk regularly during that time. It is common practice for the patient to require at least two treatment sessions separated by several weeks to significantly improve the appearance of their leg veins.

Sclerotherapy can also be performed using microfoam sclerosants under ultrasound guidance to treat larger varicose veins, including the great and small saphenous veins. After a map of the patient's varicose veins is created using ultrasound, these veins are injected whilst real-time monitoring of the injections is undertaken, also using ultrasound. The sclerosant can be observed entering the vein, and further injections performed so that all the abnormal veins are treated. Follow-up ultrasound scans are used to confirm closure of the treated veins and any residual varicose veins can be identified and treated.

=== Foam sclerotherapy ===
Foam sclerotherapy is a technique that involves injecting "foamed sclerosant drugs" within a blood vessel using a pair of syringes – one with sclerosant in it and one with gas (originally air). The original Tessari method has now been modified by the Whiteley-Patel modification which uses 3 syringes, all of which are silicone-free. The sclerosant drugs (sodium tetradecyl sulfate, bleomycin or polidocanol) are mixed with air or a physiological gas (carbon dioxide) in a syringe or by using mechanical pumps. This increases the surface area of the drug. The foam sclerosant drug is more efficacious than the liquid one in causing sclerosis (thickening of the vessel wall and sealing off the blood flow), for it does not mix with the blood in the vessel and in fact displaces it, thus avoiding dilution of the drug and causing maximal sclerosant action. It is therefore useful for longer and larger veins. Experts in foam sclerotherapy have created "tooth paste" like thick foam for their injections, which has revolutionized the non-surgical treatment of varicose veins and venous malformations, including Klippel–Trénaunay syndrome.

=== Modified microfoam sclerotherapy ===
Modified microfoam sclerotherapy (MMFST) is a variant of foam sclerotherapy developed by Prof. Dr. N. Radhakrishnan for treating chronic venous deficiency (CVD) and varicose veins. Unlike conventional liquid-based sclerotherapy, MMFST uses microfoam — a sclerosant (polidocanol) mixed with air to produce fine bubbles—which increases surface area contact with vein walls, improves efficacy, and allows treatment with a lower total dose of the agent.

In MMFST, the microfoam spreads circumferentially and retrogradely within the vein under controlled pressure, ensuring optimal endothelial contact. The foam's stability is enhanced by binding with plasma proteins such as albumin, prolonging its sclerosant activity ResearchGateJVS Venous. Crucially, this technique allows the treatment of very small venous networks, including venules that are usually unreachable by traditional approaches.

=== Bleomycin electrosclerotherapy ===
Bleomycin electrosclerotherapy consists of locally delivering the sclerosant bleomycin and applying short high voltage electrical pulses to the area to be treated, resulting in a local and temporary increased permeability of the cell membranes, increasing the intracellular concentration of bleomycin by a factor of up to several thousand. Preclinical studies also indicated that electroporation in combination with bleomycin impaired the barrier function of the endothelium by interacting with the organization of the cytoskeleton and the integrity of the junctions. This can lead to extravasation, interstitial edema and a desired collapse of the vascular structures. The procedure has been researched as electrochemotherapy of skin tumors since the early 1990s and was first used in 2017 for vascular malformations. Initial reports indicated that the use of bleomycin in combination with reversible electroporation can potentially enhance the sclerotherapy effect. A retrospective study of 17 patients with venous malformations who did not respond to previous invasive therapies showed an average decrease in lesion volume measured on MRI images of 86% with clinical improvement in all patients after an average of 3.7 months and 1.12 sessions per patient, with a reduced dose of bleomycin and a reduced number of sessions compared to standard bleomycin sclerotherapy

== Clinical evaluations ==
A study by Kanter and Thibault in 1996 reported a 76% success rate at 24 months in treating saphenofemoral junction and great saphenous vein incompetence with STS 3% solution. Padbury and Benveniste found that ultrasound guided sclerotherapy was effective in controlling reflux in the small saphenous vein. Barrett et al. found that microfoam ultrasound guided sclerotherapy was "effective in treating all sizes of varicose veins with high patient satisfaction and improvement in quality of life".

A Cochrane Collaboration review of the medical literature concluded that "the evidence supports the current place of sclerotherapy in modern clinical practice, which is usually limited to treatment of recurrent varicose veins following surgery and thread veins." A second Cochrane Collaboration review comparing surgery to sclerotherapy concluded that sclerotherapy has greater benefits than surgery in the short term but surgery has greater benefits in the longer term. Sclerotherapy was better than surgery in terms of treatment success, complication rate and cost at one year, but surgery was better after five years. However, the evidence was not of very good quality and more research is needed.

A Health Technology Assessment found that sclerotherapy provided less benefit than surgery, but is likely to provide a small benefit in varicose veins without reflux from the sapheno-femoral or sapheno-popliteal junctions. It did not study the relative benefits of surgery and sclerotherapy in varicose veins with junctional reflux.

The European Consensus Meeting on Foam Sclerotherapy in 2003 concluded that "Foam sclerotherapy allows a skilled practitioner to treat larger veins including saphenous trunks". A second European Consensus Meeting on Foam Sclerotherapy in 2006 has now been published.

== Complications ==
Complications, while rare, include venous thromboembolism, visual disturbances, allergic reaction, thrombophlebitis, skin necrosis, and hyperpigmentation or a red treatment area.

If the sclerosant is injected properly into the vein, there is no damage to the surrounding skin, but if it is injected outside the vein, tissue necrosis and scarring can result. Skin necrosis, whilst rare, can be cosmetically "potentially devastating", and may take months to heal. It is very rare when small amounts of dilute (<0.25%) sodium tetradecyl sulfate (STS) is used, but has been seen when higher concentrations (3%) are used. Blanching of the skin often occurs when STS is injected into arterioles (small artery branches). Telangiectatic matting, or the development of tiny red vessels, is unpredictable and usually must be treated with repeat sclerotherapy or laser.

Most complications occur due to an intense inflammatory reaction to the sclerotherapy agent in the area surrounding the injected vein. In addition, there are systemic complications that are now becoming increasingly understood. These occur when the sclerosant travels through the veins to the heart, lung and brain. A recent report attributed a stroke to foam treatment, although this involved the injection of an unusually large amount of foam. More recent reports have shown that bubbles from even a small amount of sclerosant foam injected into the veins quickly appear in the heart, lung and brain. The significance of this is not fully understood at this point and large studies show that foam sclerotherapy is safe. Sclerotherapy is fully FDA approved in the USA.

Contraindications include: bed rest, severe systemic diseases, poor patient understanding, needle phobia, short life expectancy, late stage cancer, known allergy to the sclerosing agent, and treatment with tamoxifen.

== See also ==
- Pleurodesis
- CLaCS, a treatment using a transdermal laser and sclerotherapy
