= Dextran sulphate sodium =

Identifiers
CAS Number	9011-18-1
ECHA InfoCard	100.111.851
EC Number	618-471-1
CompTox Dashboard (EPA)	DTXSID7044057
- Except where otherwise noted, data are given for materials in their standard state (at 25 °C [77 °F], 100 kPa). Infobox references

Dextran sulphate sodium (DSS), or dextran sodium sulphate (or any of the former with "sulfate") is a synthetic sulphated polysaccharide with anticoagulant activity used in immunological research to induce colitis. Dextran polymer molecules with a molecular weight of 36–50 kDa are frequently used to this end.

== DSS-induced colitis ==
DSS-induced colitis is the most widely used mouse model of colitis, such as is seen in inflammatory bowel disease (IBD). Acute colitis can be achieved within 7–10 days, while chronic colitis can be induced by 3-5 cycles of the former with 1–2 weeks in between each cycle.

=== Mechanism ===
DSS is thought to induce colitis by causing injury to the colonic epithelium. The sulphate groups make the dextran molecules highly negatively charged and induce erosions in the epithelium, eventually compromising its integrity and increasing its permeability, while DSS's anticoagulant action promotes intestinal bleeding.
