= S100A13 =

Protein found in humans

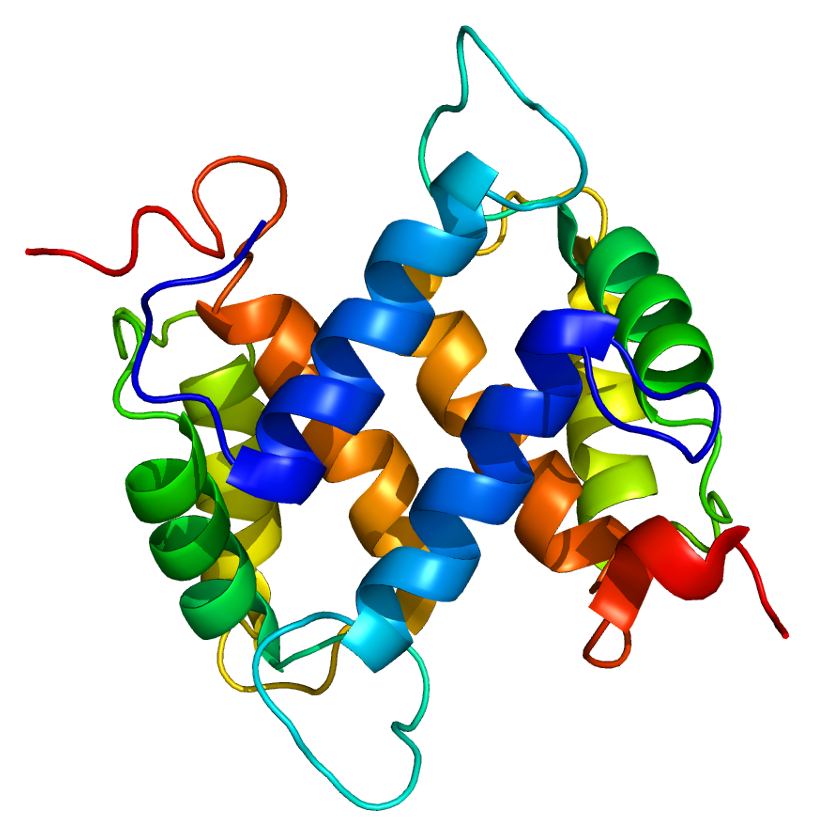

Identifiers
- Aliases: S100A13, S100 calcium binding protein A13
- External IDs: OMIM: 601989; MGI: 109581; GeneCards: S100A13
Available structures
PDB	Ortholog search: PDBe RCSB
PDB	List of PDB id codes 1YUR, 1YUS, 1YUT, 1YUU, 2EGD, 2H2K, 2K8M, 2KI4, 2KI6, 2KOT, 2L5X, 2LE9

Gene location (Human)
Chr.	Chromosome 1 (human)
Band	1q21.3	Start	153,618,787 bp
Band	1q21.3	End	153,631,360 bp

Gene location (Mouse)
Chr.	Chromosome 3 (mouse)
Band	3 F1|3 39.24 cM	Start	90,421,742 bp
Band	3 F1|3 39.24 cM	End	90,431,888 bp
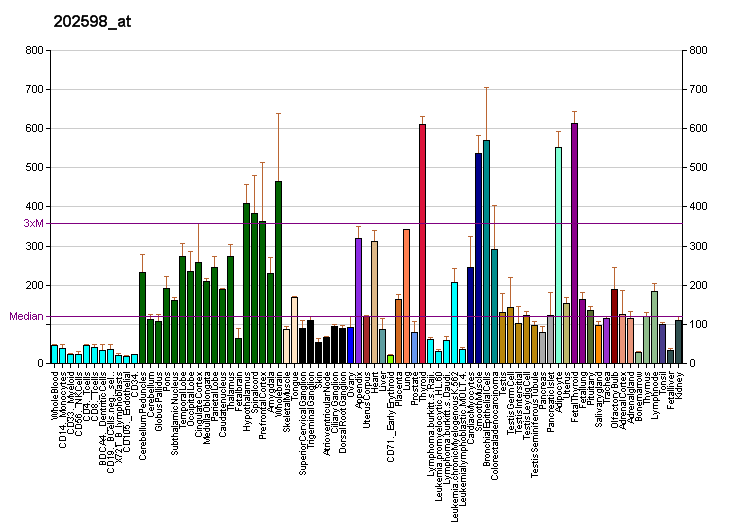
RNA expression pattern
Bgee	Human / Mouse (ortholog); Top expressed in: right lobe of thyroid gland; left lobe of thyroid gland; Achilles tendon; substantia nigra; putamen; C1 segment; amygdala; right uterine tube; nucleus accumbens; caudate nucleus / Top expressed in: lactiferous gland; interventricular septum; cardiac muscle tissue of left ventricle; brown adipose tissue; ankle joint; subcutaneous adipose tissue; granulocyte; superior surface of tongue; right lung lobe; optic nerve; More reference expression data
BioGPS	More reference expression data
Gene ontology
Molecular function	calcium ion binding; protein homodimerization activity; zinc ion binding; metal ion binding; protein binding; RAGE receptor binding; fibroblast growth factor binding; copper ion binding; lipid binding
Cellular component	cytoplasm; cytosol; perinuclear region of cytoplasm; nucleus; mast cell granule; extracellular space; nucleolus; plasma membrane; extracellular region
Biological process	response to copper ion; response to electrical stimulus; positive regulation of cell population proliferation; regulation of cell shape; protein transport; positive regulation of I-kappaB kinase/NF-kappaB signaling; mast cell degranulation
Sources:Amigo / QuickGO
Orthologs
Databases	NCBI: entry; OMA: entry
Species	Human	Mouse
Entrez	6284	20196
Ensembl	ENSG00000189171	ENSMUSG00000042312
UniProt	Q99584	P97352
RefSeq (mRNA)	NM_001024210; NM_001024211; NM_001024212; NM_001024213; NM_005979	NM_009113
RefSeq (protein)	NP_001019381; NP_001019382; NP_001019383; NP_001019384; NP_005970	NP_033139
Location (UCSC)	Chr 1: 153.62 – 153.63 Mb	Chr 3: 90.42 – 90.43 Mb
PubMed search
- Wikidata
View/Edit Human	View/Edit Mouse

S100 calcium-binding protein A13 (S100A13) is a protein that in humans is encoded by the S100A13 gene.

== Function ==
The protein encoded by this gene is a member of the S100 family of proteins containing 2 EF-hand calcium-binding motifs. S100 proteins are localized in the cytoplasm and/or nucleus of a wide range of cells, and involved in the regulation of a number of cellular processes such as cell cycle progression and differentiation. S100 genes include at least 13 members which are located as a cluster on chromosome 1q21. This protein is widely expressed in various types of tissues with a high expression level in thyroid gland. In smooth muscle cells, this protein co-expresses with other family members in the nucleus and in stress fibers, suggesting diverse functions in signal transduction. Multiple alternatively spliced transcript variants encoding the same protein have been found for this gene.

== Interactions ==
S100A13 has been shown to interact with SYT1 and FGF1.

== Pathology ==
Up-regulation of S100A13 was detected in cystic papillary thyroid carcinoma and association of S100A13 expression and chemotherapy resistance was shown in proteomics study of melanoma.
