= Heparinoid =

Class of polysaccharides

Heparinoids are glycosaminoglycans which are chemically and pharmacologically related to heparin. They include oligosaccharides and sulfated polysaccharides of plant, animal, or synthetic origin. Multiple scientific studies have been conducted on heparinoids.

Heparinoids, like heparin, act by interacting with heparin binding proteins, generally through ionic interactions or hydrogen bonding. Some examples of heparin binding proteins include antithrombin III. It is thought that much protein interaction with heparin is not direct, and instead heparin binding protein actually interact with glycosaminoglycan (GAG) side chains or mucins bound to the heparin polymer, so it is possible that heparinoids interact with these proteins in a similar way, acquiring GAG side chains in vivo. One counterexample is the protein chymase, which directly binds to heparin.

== Sulfated polysaccharides ==
=== From animal tissues ===
Dermatan sulfate is one example of a compound that is classified as a heparinoid. It is a naturally occurring polysaccharide of O-sulfated N-acetyl-D-galatosamine, L-iduronic acid, and D-glucuronic acid that has been clinically used as an antithrombotic agent.

Chondroitin sulfate shows slightly less biological activity than dermatan sulfate, and is composed of O-sulfated N-acetyl-D-galatosamine and D-glucuronic acid. It is theorized that this change in efficacy is related to the absence of L-induronic acid, which affects the flexibility of the polymer chain.

Acharan sulfate is a heparinoid that is naturally produced by the giant African land snail, Lissachatina fulica. Keratan sulfate is a heparinoid that is a component of cartilage. It is found in the cornea.

Chitin, a component of insect shells and fungal structures, can be de-N-acetylated to form chitosan, which when sulfated has a significant chemical similarity to heparin. In fact, it inhibits thrombin by affecting ATIII.

Lepirudin is a recombinant preparation of the polypeptide anticoagulant secreted by leeches and is used in patients with heparin induced thrombocytopenia.

=== From plant sources ===
Fucoidan is a polymer composed of sulfated L-fucose.

Carrageenans are isolated from algae.

Hyaluronan functions as a heparinoid when it is sulfated. Intra-articular injections of hyaluronic acid are used to mitigate pain and treat symptoms of osteoarthritis in the knee, but such injections are correlated with increased risk of serious side effects.

Alginic acid functions as a heparinoid when it is sulfated.

Pentosan from the bark of Fagus sylvatica, when sulfated, acts with one-tenth of the efficacy of heparin.

=== From microbial sources ===
K5 polysaccharide from E. coli acts as a heparinoid when it is sulfated.

== History ==
Heparin was first isolated from dog liver by medical student Jay McClean in 1916. Jorpes discovered the structure of the heparin polysaccharide in 1935, identifying that it is a highly sulfated polymer of glycosaminoglycoglycan (GAG) and uronic acid. Around that time, heparin began to be used in the prophylaxis and treatment of post-operative thrombosis.

== Production ==
There is no industrial process for the complete synthesis of heparin; heparin is isolated from animal tissue - generally bovine lung, porcine, and intestinal mucosa. Heparinoids generally are also naturally occurring polysaccharides, and similarly need to be purified from the plant or animal tissue that produces them.

== Regulation ==
There is no internationally accepted molecular standard for the composition of heparin, as it is a complex polymer of GAG units and uronic acids (including D-glucuronic acid, L-iduronic acid, and D-glucosamine). Position of N-acetyl, N-sulfate, and O-sulfate groups in these uronic acids can vary, as can the branching patterns of the chain. This generates an extraordinary amount of variability between molecules of heparin. Current USP standards for heparin limit levels of contamination with dermatan, chondroitin, and over-sulfated chondroitin sulfate, as well as galactosamine levels in the sample, as determined by HPLC, H-NMR, and Strong Anion Exchange Chromatography.

== See also ==
- ATC code B01AB Antithrombotic agents, heparin group
- ATC code C05BA Heparins or heparinoids for topical use
