= Vasoprotective =

Medication for conditions affecting blood vessels

A vasoprotective is a medication which acts to alleviate or prevent conditions or diseases which affect the blood vessels. The term is used in the World Health Organization's Anatomical Therapeutic Chemical Classification System to encompass therapeutic agents used in the treatment of hemorrhoids or varicose veins. The term may also be used to describe drugs which lower the risk of developing hypercholesterolemia or hypertension.

Examples of vasoprotectives include 1-methylnicotinamide, estrogen, tribenoside, and valsartan. More specifically, arterial vasoprotectors are called angioprotectors.

== See also ==
- ATC code C05
