= Claude Franceschi =

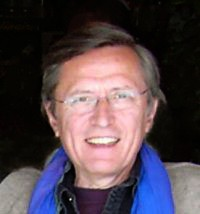
- Born: October 12, 1942 (age 82); Calenzana, Corsica
- Occupation(s): Internal medicine Hemodynamics
- Notable work: Doppler Ultrasound and arteries, veins, lymphatic diseases

Claude Franceschi (born October 12, 1942) is an angiologist French MD.

== Background ==
After Shigeo Satomura who detected for the first time the blood flow with a Doppler Ultrasound machine, Gene Strandness measured the blood pressure at the ankle (1967), Léandre Pourcelot proposed the Arterial resistivity index (1974), and Gosling the Pulsatility index (1974).

Claude Franceschi then tried to analyze more exactly the hemodynamic meaning of the Doppler signal wave from normal and diseased vessels. He published the results at numerous conferences and in the French book "L'Investigation vasculaire par ultrasonographie Doppler" ("Vascular Doppler ultrasound investigation") in 1977.

== Works ==
Franceschi's major work was to match the principles of fluid mechanics with arterial and venous hemodynamics. After studying the correlations between the Doppler ultrasound, radiological and surgical data, he laid down the methodological and semiotic bases of vascular Doppler ultrasound.

- In 1977, he published the very first book in the world on Vascular Doppler Exploration (Vascular investigation by Doppler ultrasound) then translated into Italian and Spanish, in which he describes the hemodynamic principles and their expression in terms of Doppler signal. This data remains the undisputed reference for the stenosis quantification and a quality diagnostic. In particular, he worked on the criteria of arterial stenosis of limbs and carotids, Carotid pre-thrombosis, the Pressure-Perfusion Index (Franceschi Index), the Carotid Ratio and the exploration of the Circle of Willis.
- In 1978, he published the first observations of carotid plaque regression.
- In 1980 he described the Fistula Flow Ratio (French 'RDF') to assess the flow of arteriovenous fistulas, especially in renal dialysis.
- In 1981, he invented an interface process which allows for the first time the visualization of supra-aortic arteries by B-Mode echography. A Doppler method for exploring the compensatory ways of the cerebro-cervical vasculature was published the same year.
- In 1986, he published the first book of vascular ultrasound imaging Précis d'échotomographie vasculaire translated into Italian: « Compendio di ecotomografia vascolare »
- In 1988, he published the book La cure Conservatrice et Hémodynamique de l'Insuffisance Veineuse en Ambulatoire: CHIVA also translated into English and Italian, where he offers a new approach to the physiology of deep and superficial venous circulation, introducing new concepts such as « Dynamic hydrostatic pressure fractioning », the veno-venous shunts and vicarious evolution of varices.

According to this theory, varicose veins are not, as well as edema and ulcers, the cause of the venous insufficiency, but the result of venous valves incompetence instead and/or obstacles to the flow. Furthermore, destroying varices in impeding the natural drainage of the skin, would be responsible for relapses by a compensation effect (vicarious shunts). The CHIVA method removes the overload flow and pressure, resulting in ulcer healing and returning the normal caliber of the veins, including varicose veins. It merely consists in the accurate splitting of the gravitational hydrostatic pressure of the venous column and in the disconnection of closed shunts (depending on the particular configuration of each patient). From 1 to 5 divisions/ligatures are performed under local anesthetics and without hospitalization (ambulatory). In addition, the saphenous veins are saved, a considerable advantage since these veins are the best material for by-passing the peripheral arteries, and completing Coronary artery bypass surgery, more and more necessary for the aging population. Several randomized controlled trials and a Cochrane Library review have demonstrated CHIVA superiority in certain specific anatomical situations to conventional removal (stripping) of the saphenous vein. The CHIVA technique as a treatment of venous insufficiency is now accepted as the standard of care in those situations where it applies. The CHIVA technique (Guidelines) and Results with Chiva (Guidelines), .

- In 1997, he describes the dynamic index of venous reflux (DRI), the Paranà Maneuver and the diagnosis of the plantar vein thrombosis by Duplex Ultrasound.
- In 2010, he published the book Principles of venous hemodynamics detailing hemodynamic concepts of the venous insufficiency and their diagnostic and therapeutic consequences.
