= Ultrasonography of chronic venous insufficiency of the legs =

Non-invasive medical procedure

Lower limbs venous ultrasonography
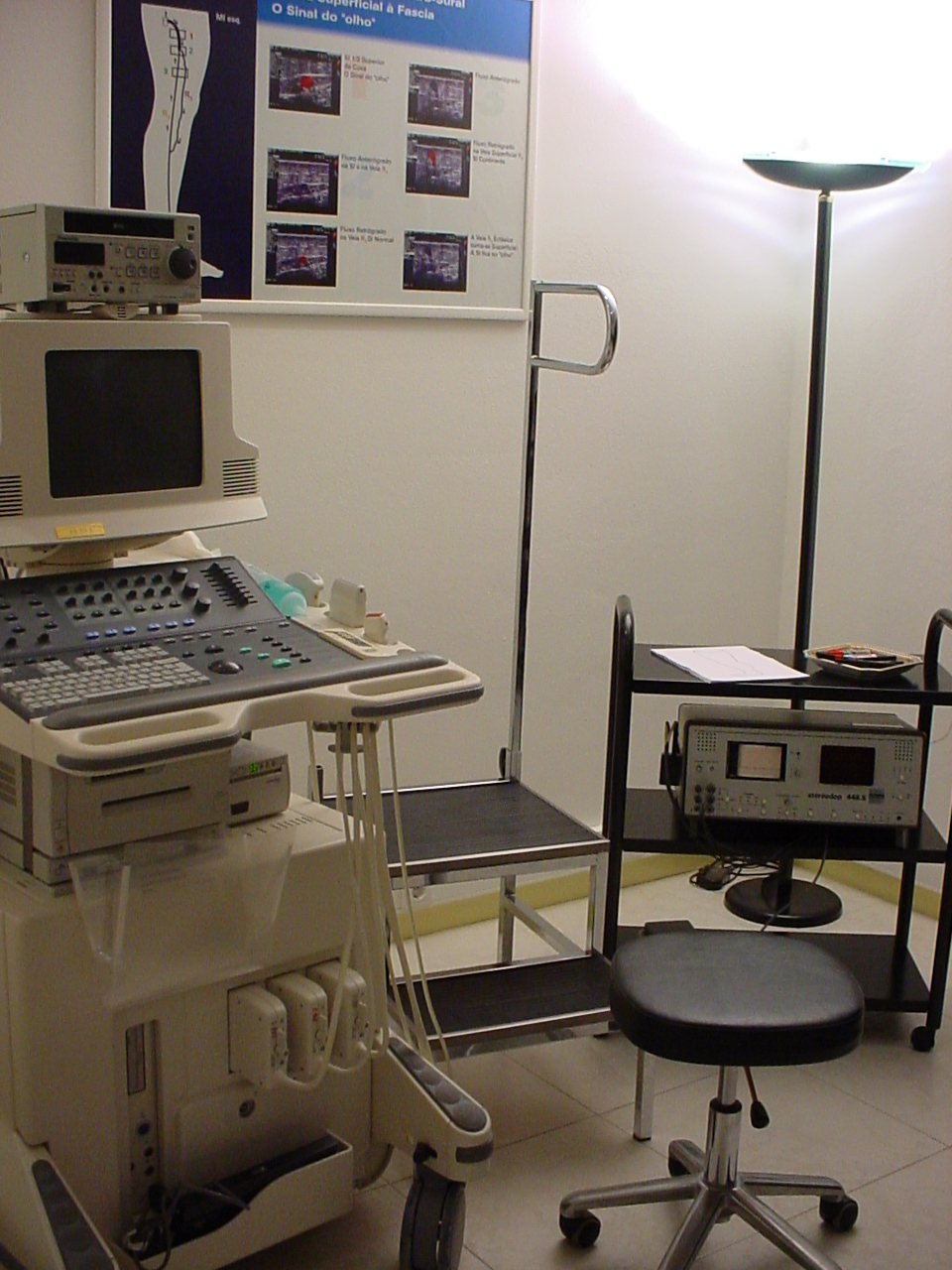
- Ultrasonography equipment. Sonographic scanner.
- Purpose: Details of anatomy, physiology and pathology of superficial veins

Ultrasonography of suspected or previously confirmed chronic venous insufficiency of leg veins is a risk-free, non-invasive procedure. It gives information about the anatomy, physiology and pathology of mainly superficial veins. As with heart ultrasound (echocardiography) studies, venous ultrasonography requires an understanding of hemodynamics in order to give useful examination reports. In chronic venous insufficiency, sonographic examination is of most benefit; in confirming varicose disease, making an assessment of the hemodynamics, and charting the progression of the disease and its response to treatment. It has become the reference standard for examining the condition and hemodynamics of the lower limb veins.

Particular veins of the deep venous system (DVS), and the superficial venous system (SVS) are looked at. The great saphenous vein (GSV), and the small saphenous vein (SSV) are superficial veins which drain into respectively, the common femoral vein and the popliteal vein. These veins are deep veins. Perforator veins drain superficial veins into the deep veins. Three anatomic compartments are described (as networks), (N1) containing the deep veins, (N2) containing the perforator veins, and (N3) containing the superficial veins, known as the saphenous compartment. This compartmentalisation makes it easier for the examiner to systematize and map. The GSV can be located in the saphenous compartment where together with the Giacomini vein and the accessory saphenous vein (ASV) an image resembling an eye, known as the 'eye sign' can be seen. The ASV which is often responsible for varicose veins, can be located at the 'alignment sign', where it is seen to align with the femoral vessels.

On ultrasound at the saphenofemoral junction in the groin, the common femoral vein (CFV) with the GSV and the common femoral artery (CFA) create an image called the Mickey Mouse sign. The CFV represents the head, and the CFA and GSV represent the ears. The examination report will include details of the deep and the superficial vein systems, and their mapping. The mapping is drawn on paper and then drawn on the patient before surgery.

The use of ultrasonography in a medical application was first used in the late 1940s in the United States. This use was soon followed in other countries with further research and development being carried out. The first report on Doppler ultrasound as a diagnostic tool for vascular disease was published in 1967–1968. Rapid advances since then in electronics, have greatly improved ultrasound transmission tomography.

== Medical uses ==
Ultrasonography of chronic venous insufficiency of the legs allows the examiner to evaluate the gross anatomy of the venous networks as well as the blood flow direction, which is crucial in determining vein pathology. It has become the reference standard used in the assessment of the condition and hemodynamics of the veins of the lower limbs.

The normal physiological blood flow is antegrade, flowing from the periphery towards the heart, so evidence of an opposite, retrograde flow might indicate a pathology.

The presence of a reflux is likewise of note; a reflux, when not isolated in a vein (as simply retrograde), means that the blood flow is bi-directional where once the flow had been only antegrade.

== Risks ==
No contraindications are known for this examination. Ultrasonography does not involve the use of ionizing radiation, and the procedure is harmless and can be safely used on anybody of any age. A 1998 World Health Organization report supports this.

== Preparation ==
No preparation is normally necessary for this examination, but if a complementary study of abdominal veins is also required, the patient will be asked to fast for 12 hours beforehand. The sensitivity and specificity measurements are around 90%.

== Equipment ==
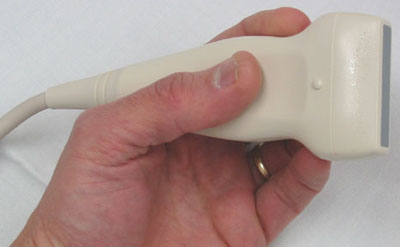
High frequency probe used for superficial ultrasonography

The ultrasound equipment must be sufficiently high-quality to give a correct image-processing result, which can then provide invaluable information, mainly at the superficial level. It must be able to provide both color and Doppler imaging, technologies that developed alongside the development of ultrasound. Doppler measurements which trace the echoes of the generated soundwaves received by the probe, enable the direction and velocity of the blood flow to be depicted. The overlay of color onto the Doppler information lets these images be seen more clearly.

The choice of a probe will depend on the depth needed to be studied. For example, the superficial venous system (SVS) can be very well examined using a high-frequency probe of 12 MHz. For patients who have thick adipose tissue, a probe of 7.5 MHz will be required. Deep veins require probes of around 6 MHz, while the abdominal vessels are better studied with probes of between 4 and 6 MHz. In summary, three probes are needed together with a top level scanner.

Also, the proper use of the scanner calls for a high level of expertise, so the examiner must be well qualified and experienced in order to give effective results. In contrast to arterial ultrasonography, the wall of the vein is not relevant and importance is given to the hemodynamic conclusions that the examiner can obtain in order to provide a valuable report. (Hemodynamics is the study of blood flow and of the laws that govern the circulation of blood in the blood vessels.) It follows that the examiner's knowledge of venous hemodynamics is crucial, which can be a real barrier to a radiologist, untrained in this field, who might wish to carry out these examinations. Specialized training in venous ultrasonography is not undertaken in some countries, which undermines best practice, mainly when varicose veins need to be examined.

== Mechanism ==
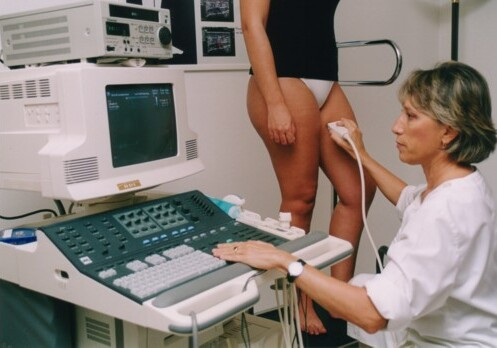
Performing venous ultrasonography

Ultrasonography is based on the principle that sound can pass through human body tissues and is reflected by the tissue interfaces (Note: Interface is the plane between two tissues with a different density, for instance skin-fat-aponevrosis-muscle.) in the same way that light can reflect back on itself from a mirror. Tissue in the body will offer varying degrees of resistance, known as acoustic impedance, to the path of the ultrasound beam. When there is a high impedance difference between two tissues, the interface between them will strongly reflect the sound. When the ultrasound beam meets air, or solid tissue such as bone, their impedance difference is so great that most of the acoustic energy is reflected, making it impossible to see any underlying structures. The examiner will see just a shadow, instead of the image expected. Air will impede sound waves, which is why a gel is used. The gel prevents air bubbles from forming between the probe and the patient's skin, and so helps the conduction of the sound waves from the transducer into the body. The watery medium also helps conduct the sound waves. Liquids, including blood, have a low impedance, which means that little energy will be reflected and no visualization possible. One of the important exceptions is that when the blood flow is very slow, it can in fact be seen, in what is termed "spontaneous contrast".

This technology is widely used in confirming venous pathology diagnoses. The imaging capability needed was made possible with the developments of Doppler and color Doppler. Doppler measurements using Doppler effect can show the direction of the blood flow and its relative velocity, and color Doppler is the provision of color to help interpret the image, showing, for example, the blood flow toward the probe in one color and that flowing away in another. While the equipment itself is costly, the procedure is not. Apart from the scanner, different probes are required according to the depth to be studied. A gel is used with the probe to make a good acoustic impedance contact. The training and expertise of the examiner is important because of the many technical complications that can present. Venous anatomy, for example, is not constant; for example, a patient's vein layout of the right limb is not identical to that of the left limb.

The probe is an ultrasonic sensor, generally known as a transducer, which functions to send and receive acoustic energy. The emission is generated on piezoelectric crystals by the piezoelectric effect. The reflected ultrasound is received by the probe, transformed into an electric impulse as voltage, and sent to the engine for signal processing and conversion to an image on the screen. The depth reached by the ultrasound beam is dependent on the frequency of the probe used. The higher the frequency, the lesser the depth reached.

== Procedure ==
The patient will need to be in an upright position to enable a proper study of blood flow direction

Chronic venous insufficiency occurs when veins cannot pump enough blood back to the heart. It results when the vein dilates secondary to a vein wall disease or when normal functioning of the valves, which serve to keep blood flowing to the heart and to prevent reflux, become damaged and/or incompetent (the dilation of a vein will prevent valves from closing properly). This incompetence will result in reversed blood flow through the affected vein or veins. It can result in varicose veins and, in severe cases, in venous ulcer. The reversed blood pools in the low third of legs and feet.

Unlike in the arterial ultrasound study, when the sonographer studies venous insufficiency, the vein wall itself has no relevance and attention is focused on the direction of blood flow. The objective of the examination is to see how the veins drain. In this way, venous ultrasonography has at times become a hemodynamic examination which is reserved for experienced sonographers who have completed hemodynamic studies and training and have acquired a deep knowledge of this subject.

Also, unlike ultrasonography of deep venous thrombosis, the procedure focuses mainly on superficial veins.

Also, unlike the arterial ultrasound examination, blood velocity in veins has no diagnostic meaning. Veins are a draining system similar to a low pressure hydraulic system, with a laminar flow and a low velocity. This low velocity is responsible for the fact that it can only be detected spontaneously with the Doppler effect on the proximal and larger femoral and iliac veins. Here the flow is either modulated by the respiratory rhythm or is continuous in cases where the flow is high. The thinner veins do not have a spontaneous flow.

Vein valve and spontaneous contrast

However, in some circumstances the blood flow is so slow that it can be seen as some echogenic material moving within the vein, in "spontaneous contrast". This material can easily be mistaken for a thrombus, but can also easily be discounted by testing the vein's compressibility. (Note: Echogenic is the tissue which reflects the ultrasound beam and can be visualized on the screen.)

To evidence the blood flow direction, there are some techniques that the examiner can use to accelerate blood flow and show valvular function:

- Manual squeezing and releasing – the examiner can compress the vein below the probe, which will push the blood in its normal antegrade direction. On releasing the pressure, if the valves are incompetent the flow will appear as a retrograde flow or reflux, greater than 0.5 sec.

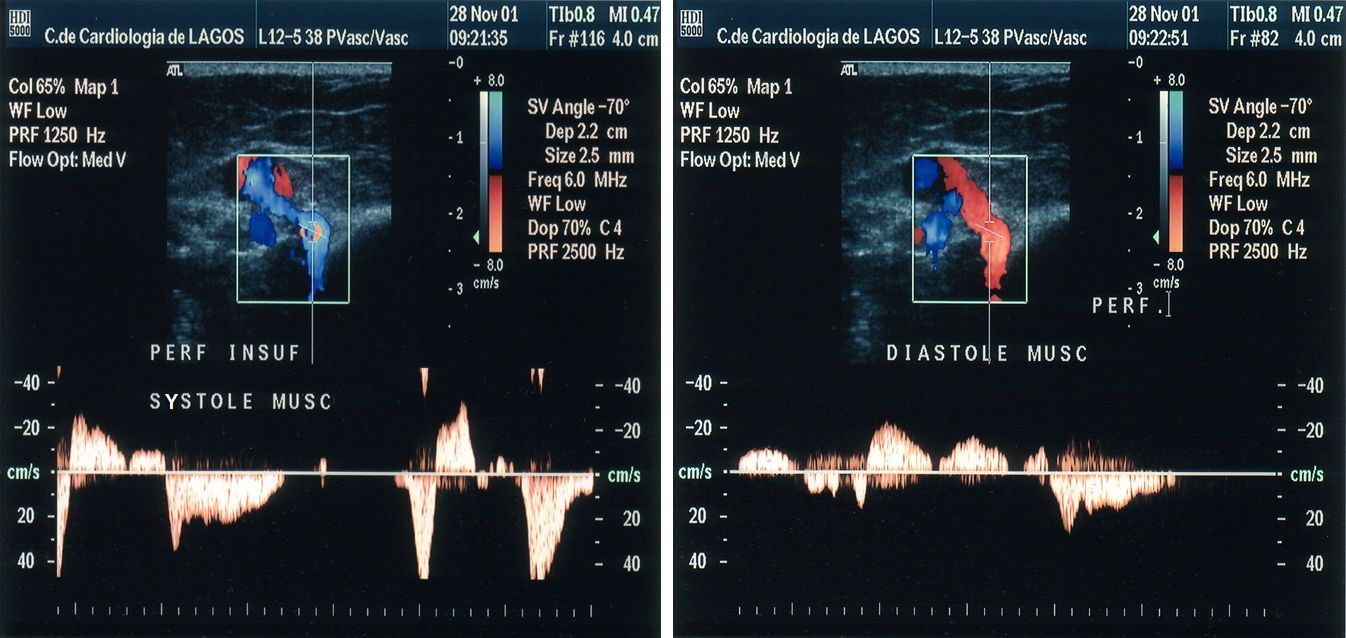
Paraná maneuver: checking perforators

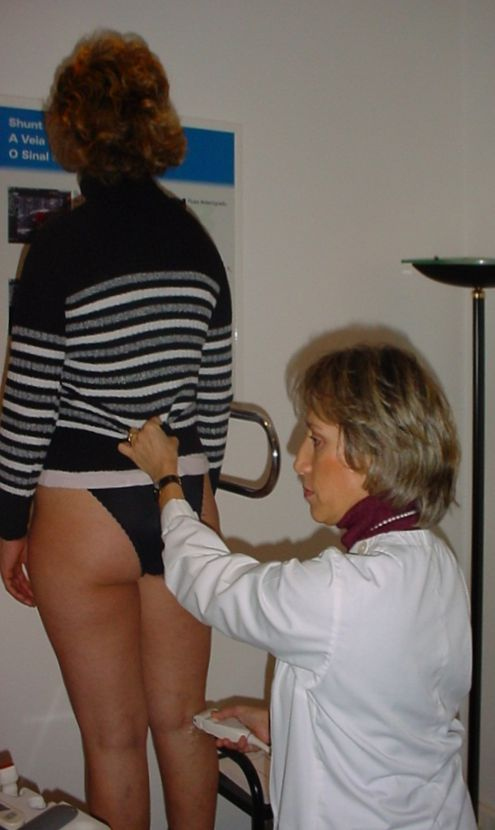
Testing sapheno-popliteal junction with Paraná maneuver

- The Paraná maneuver makes use of a proprioceptive reflex to test venous-muscle-pump- induced flow. (A proprioceptive reflex is a response to a perceived stimulus, especially with regard to movement and position of the body.) A slight push to the waist triggers a muscle contraction in the leg to maintain posture. This maneuver is very useful for studying deep-vein flow and detecting valvular incompetence, mainly at the popliteal-vein level (at the back of the knee), and to check perforator-vein incompetence. It is very useful when legs are painful or very edematous (swollen with fluid).
- Flexing the toes and feet and extending on tiptoes can all be very useful in detecting perforator vein incompetence. These movements unleash a muscle contraction which compresses deep veins. If a perforator valve is incompetent, then a reflux from the deep to the superficial through the perforator vein will be registered.
- Valsalva maneuver – when the patient performs this maneuver, he or she increases intra-abdominal venous pressure. If the great saphenous valve at the sapheno-femoral junction is incompetent, a reflux will appear.

Valsalva maneuver is negative.

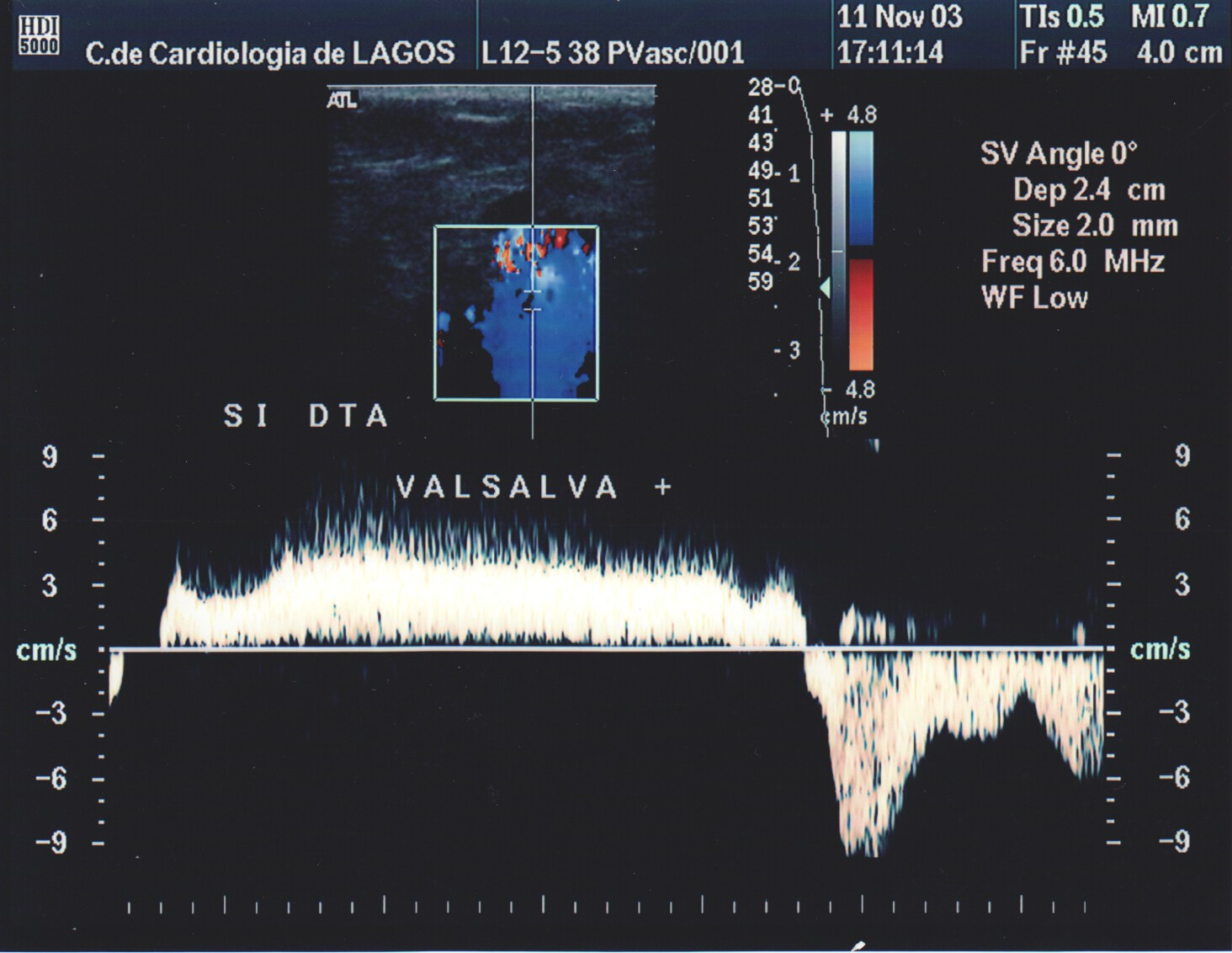
GSV insufficiency at S–F junction – Valsalva positive

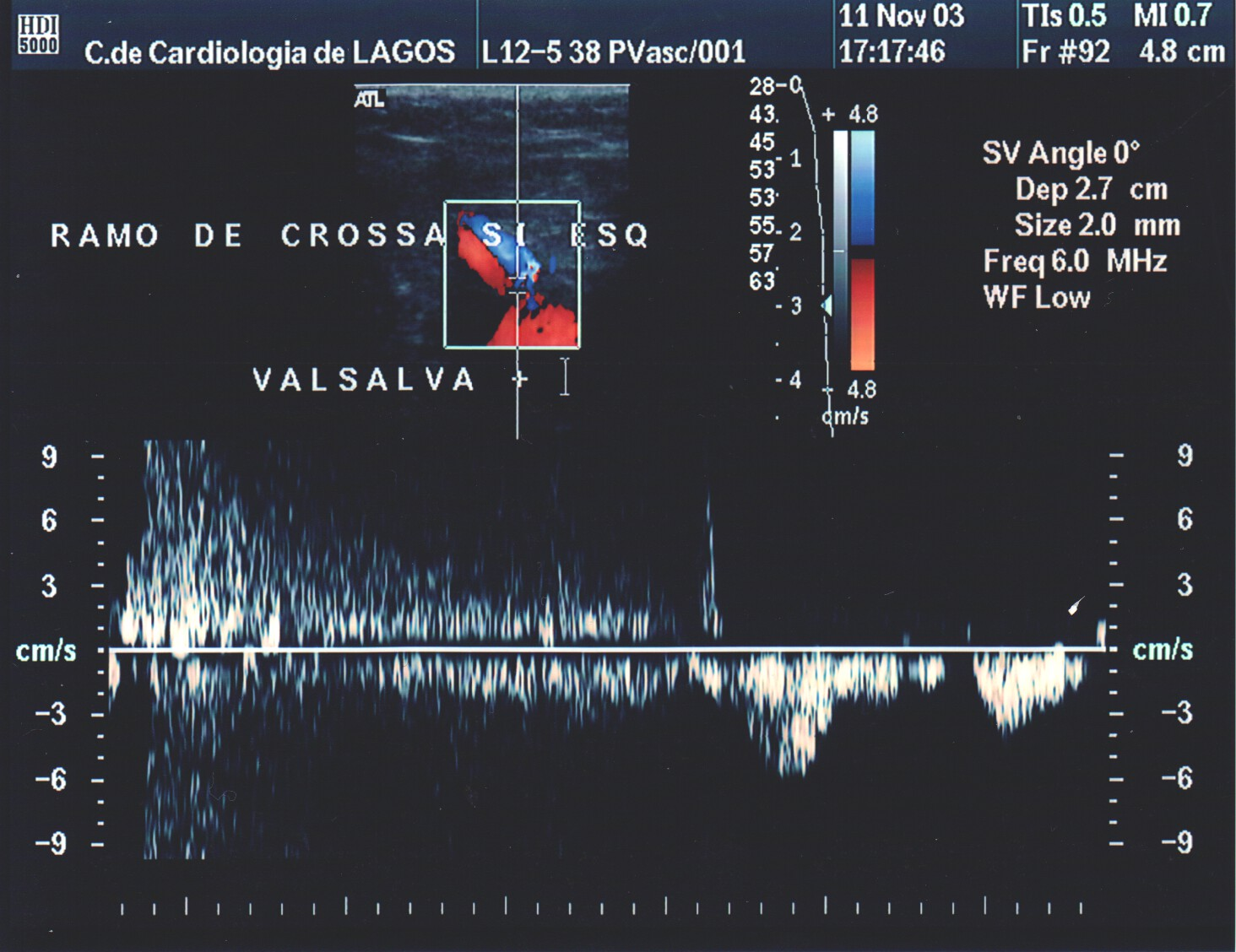
GSV Valsalva false positive – flow coming from an abdominal collateral at S–F junction

Normal blood flow is antegrade (going to the heart), and from superficial to deep veins via perforator veins. However, there are two exceptions: firstly, the GSV collaterals (the veins that run parallel) drain the abdominal wall and have a flow from top to bottom so that, when an examiner tests the saphenofemoral junction, a false-positive diagnosis might be made; secondly, in the flow from the sole of the foot venous network, around 10% drains to the dorsal venous arch of the foot, going therefore against the norm, from deep to superficial veins.

Attention will be focused on the direction of blood flow in both venous systems, and in the perforator veins, as well as on shunt detection. (Note: In venous circulation, a shunt is the situation where blood circulates from one vein (leak point) to another and from that one to the former (re-entry point), creating a pathway in a vicious circle between two veins, one with a physiologic flow and the other with a retrograde flow.) A shunting of blood from the thigh veins back into the lower-leg veins produces a reflux situation. The veins most often found to be incompetent are the saphenous veins and the perforators communicating with the deep veins of the thigh.

=== Technical difficulties ===
Venous ultrasonography of the lower limbs is the most demanding of the medical complementary examinations. It is dependent on the examiner's expertise and training, and the interpretation of the results is subjective and reliant on an understanding of venous hemodynamics. (A mapping does help the reproducibility and the inter-observer agreement of this examination.)

The examination is made even more difficult because there can be dilated veins without insufficiency (by hyper-debit), and non-dilated but incompetent veins. Moreover, veins can be discretely incompetent in summer but normal in winter. Also, by definition of insufficiency (insufficient blood flow), blood may be seen to flow freely in both directions, antegrade and retrograde, between two valves.

Another problem, when dealing with the superficial venous system, is that venous anatomy is not constant; the position of veins can vary in different patients; also, in the same patient the right lower limb is not identical to the left lower limb.

As a further complication to the examination, where venous insufficiency is evidenced, the examination needs to be done with the probe in the transversal position but the mapping must be done showing the veins in their longitudinal aspect. This demands a rapid extrapolation, by the physician, from the transversal images seen to the longitudinal drawing needed. The dynamic maneuvers also need to be well executed. The need of specialized training is mandatory, which is a huge problem for many countries.

== Particular details ==
=== Great saphenous vein ===
The GSV, a superficial vein, is the longest vein in the body. It has its origin in the dorsal venous arch of the foot, a superficial vein which connects the small saphenous vein with the GSV. It travels up the leg and medial side of the thigh to reach the groin, where it drains into the common femoral vein. Along the length of the GSV, it receives numerous tributaries (from the subcutaneous layer) and drains into the deep veins via the perforator veins.

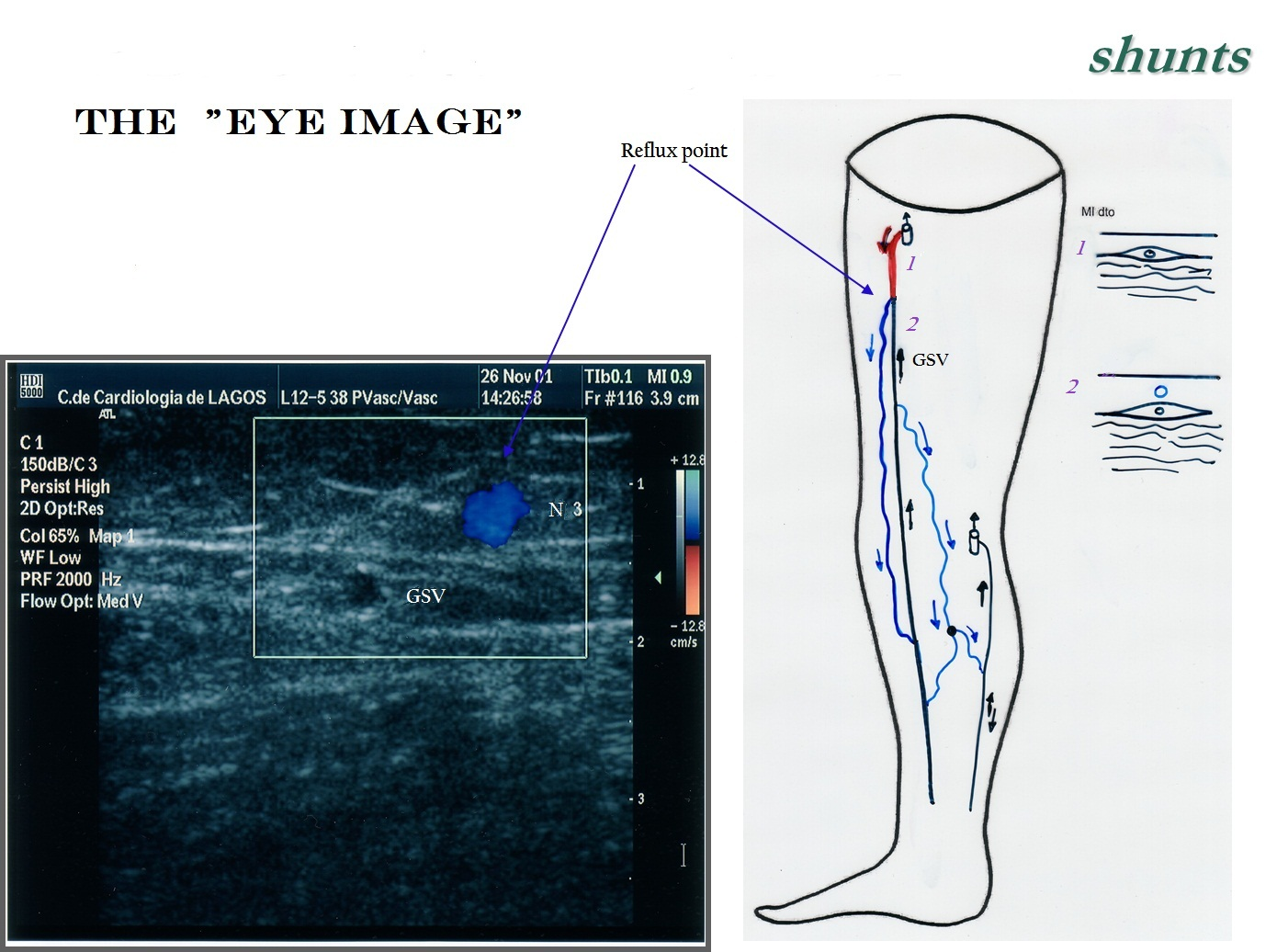
The "eye sign"

When seen in a scan, the GSV and the Giacomini vein, together with the accessory saphenous vein (ASV), form an image resembling an eye which is referred to as the "eye sign" or "eye image". All veins which are between the skin and the superficial fascia are tributaries, and all veins which cross the deep fascia to join the deep venous system are perforator veins.

Three anatomic compartments can be described, as networks:

- N1 contains the deep veins, also known as the deep compartment.
- N2 is the superficial compartment or the saphenous compartment.
- N3 is the epifascial compartment.

Some authors describe one more compartment, N4, containing collaterals which form a bypass between two distinct points of the same vein.

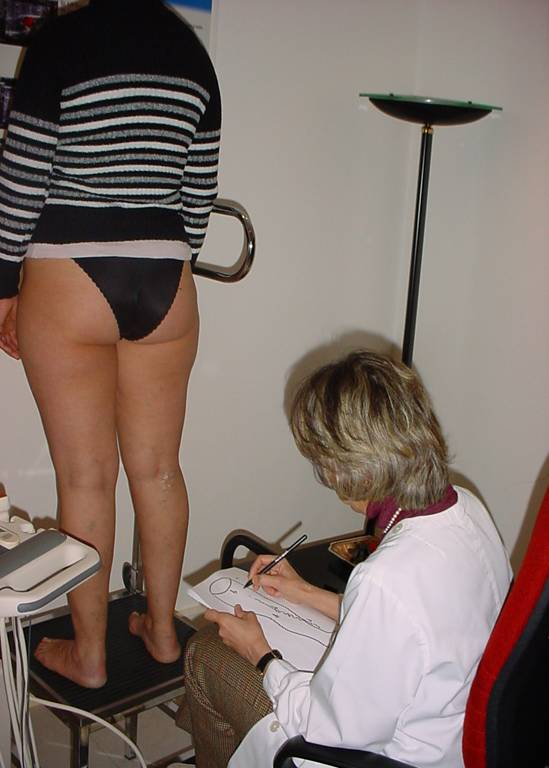
Carrying out vein mapping

This compartmentalization is useful in an ultrasonographic examination because it makes systematization, mapping execution, and any surgical strategizing easier.

Being protected between two fasciae, the superficial veins belonging to compartment N3 very rarely become sinuous. Thus, when a sinuous vein is detected, the sonographer will suspect that it is a tributary.

The sapheno-femoral junction is tested by the Valsalva maneuver, with the use of color Doppler being helpful at this stage.

The wall thickness of the vein is significantly increased in venous reflux, being approximately 0.58 mm in venous reflux, compared to up to 0.45 mm normally.

=== Accessory saphenous vein ===
ASV at sapheno-femoral junction, the "Mickey Mouse sign"

The accessory saphenous vein (ASV), either anterior or posterior, is an important GSV collateral frequently responsible for varicose veins located on the anterior and lateral aspect of the thigh. The anterior ASV is more anterior than the ASV and is outside the femoral vessels plan. The two veins terminate in a common trunk near the groin, the sapheno-femoral junction. Here, the ASV can be located aligned with the femoral vessels at the "alignment sign". Also, at the groin it can be seen at the outside of the great saphenous vein, and together with the common femoral vein (CFV) these three create an image, the so-called "Mickey Mouse sign". Some authors, inspired by this sign (presented for the first time at CHIVA's 2002 meeting in Berlin), described a "Mickey Mouse view" at the groin, an image formed by the common femoral vein, the GSV and the superficial femoral artery. When the ASV is incompetent, its flow becomes retrograde and tries to drain in the superior fibular perforator, at the side of the knee, or sometimes it runs down towards the ankle to drain in the inferior fibular perforator.

=== Small saphenous vein ===
The small saphenous vein (SSV) runs along the posterior aspect of the leg as far as the popliteal region, in the upper calf. Here it enters the popliteal space, located between the two heads of the gastrocnemius muscle, where it usually drains above the knee joint into the popliteal vein or a little less often into the GSV or other deep muscular veins of the thigh.

Ultrasonography has allowed a number of variations to be shown at this level; when no contact is made with the popliteal vein, it might be seen to drain into the GSV, at a variable level; or it may merge with the Giacomini vein and drain into the GSV at the superior 1/3 of the thigh. It can also, rarely, drain into the vein of the semimembranosus thigh muscle (shown below). Usually, though, it connects with a perforator vein at its middle 1/3. To check for insufficiency, the Paraná maneuver is very useful.

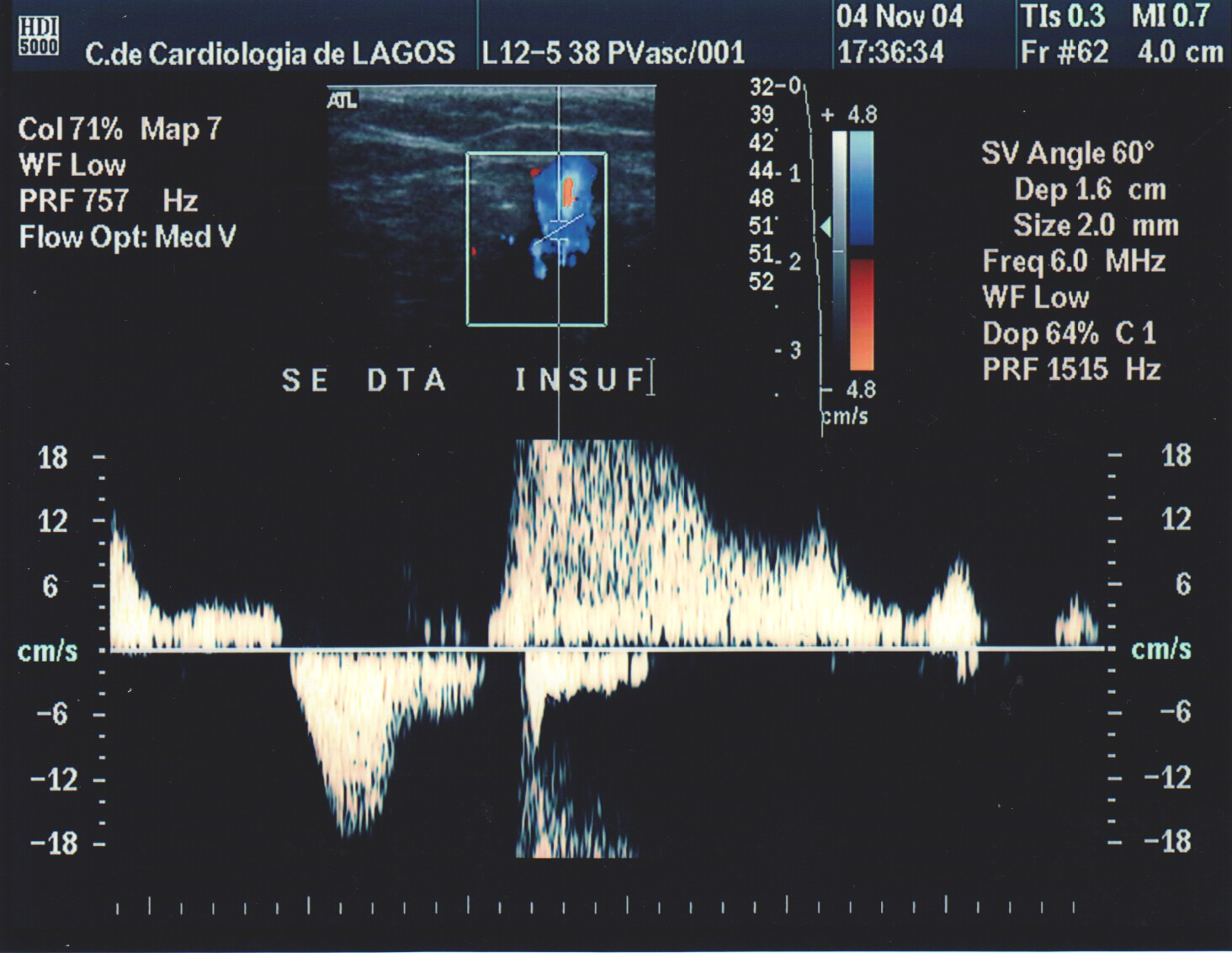
Insufficiency from the SSV at sapheno-popliteal junction

Insufficiency from the SSV flooded by the vein of the semimembranosus muscle

SSV variant draining in the vein of the semimembranosus muscle

=== Giacomini vein ===
The Giacomini vein mostly acts as a bypass between the GSV and SSV territories. Usually its flow is in the normal antegrade direction, from bottom to top. However it can become retrograde without pathology. For example, after a GSV stripping, laser ablation or after its ligation at the sapheno-femoral junction, the Giacomini vein will drain into the SSV, with a retrograde flow. When there is a GSV thrombosis or other cause of insufficiency, the Giacomini vein can divert the blood flow to the SSV and from there to the popliteal vein.

Where surgery, other than stripping or laser ablation is intended, the examiner will make reference to the blood flow direction in this vein, as it will be of importance.

=== Perforator veins ===
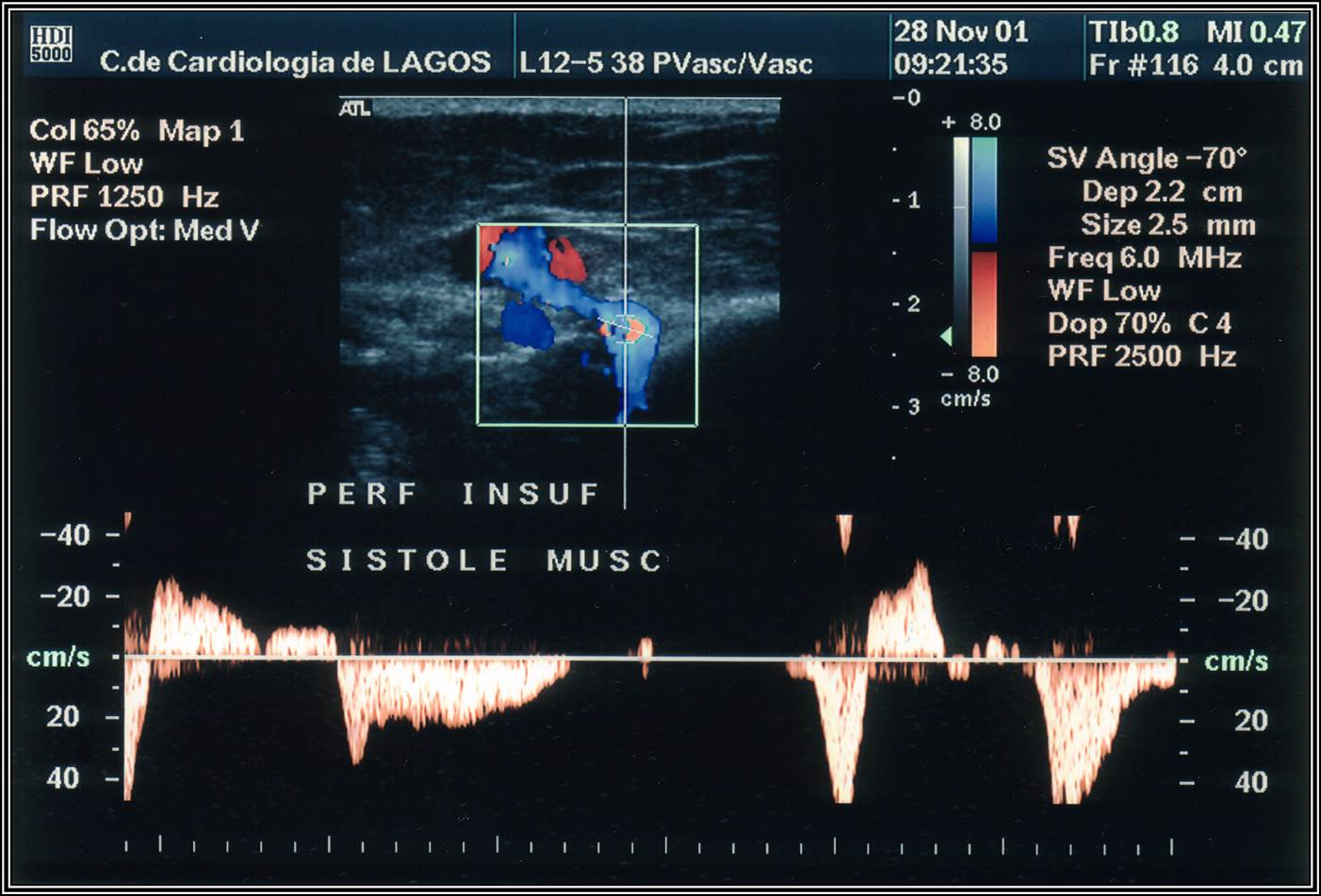
Insufficient perforator

Perforator veins play a very special role in the venous system, carrying blood from superficial to deep veins. During the muscular systole their valves close and stop any blood flow coming from the deep to the superficial veins. When their valves become insufficient, they are responsible for a rapid deterioration in existing varicose disease and for the development of venous ulcers. Detection of insufficient perforators is important because they need to be ligatured.

However, the detection of competent ones is as important because they may be used strategically in new techniques of conservative surgery, for example a minimally invasive CHIVA.

The ultrasonography report will include insufficient and continent perforators, which will also be shown on venous mapping. To test these veins properly, the examiner will need to use some techniques like the Paraná maneuver, toe and foot flexion, and hyper-extension on tip toes.

== Examination report ==
SVS normal mapping

After performing this examination, the physician writes a report in which some points are crucial:

- The condition of the deep vein system (DVS), its permeability and compressibility, and whether it is continent or insufficient;
- The permeability and compressibility of the superficial vein system (SVS), the presence or absence of superficial insufficiency, and in which veins or vein segments;
- Which perforator veins are continent or insufficient;
- The presence or absence of shunts;
- Mapping (Note: Mapping is a schematic depiction of the venous anatomic-functional configuration in an individual.) the insufficient veins, flux direction, shunts, and perforators.

This enables surgeons to plan interventions, in a stage known as virtual dissection. (Note: Virtual dissection is a schema based on venous mapping where the surgeon projects what he will do to treat his patient.) Drawn on paper, after the examination, it will be drawn over the patient's skin before surgery.

== History ==
The Doppler effect was first described by Christian Doppler in 1843. Nearly forty years later, in 1880, the piezoelectric effect was discovered and confirmed by Pierre and Jacques Curie. Both of these findings were used in the development of ultrasonography. The first ultrasound was applied to the human body for medical purposes by Dr. George Ludwig, University of Pennsylvania, in the late 1940s.

The use of ultrasonography in medicine soon followed in different locations around the world. In the mid-1950s more research was undertaken by Professor Ian Donald et al., in Glasgow, which advanced the practical technology and applications of ultrasound. In 1963, in France, Léandre Pourcelot started on his thesis, which was presented in 1964, and used pulsed Doppler for blood flow calculation as its subject. This was followed up by Peronneau in 1969. Dr. Gene Strandness and the bioengineering group at the University of Washington, who conducted research on Doppler ultrasound as a diagnostic tool for vascular disease, published their first work in 1967. The first report published about the venous system appeared around 1967–1968. A few years later, in 1977, Claude Franceschi published the very first book about vascular ultrasonography, L’investigation vasculaire par ultrasonographie Doppler.

In the 1960s commercially available systems were introduced. Soon other advances in electronics and piezoelectric materials enabled further improvements, and ultrasound was quickly adopted for use in medicine due to its rapid, accurate diagnostic capabilities offering the possibility of prompt treatment.

Alongside the improving imaging technology, acoustic Doppler velocimetry and medical ultrasonography color Doppler were developed, which have advanced many specialties, including radiology, obstetrics, gynecology, angiology and cardiology, and have provided even greater scope for ultrasound investigations. Since 1970, real-time scanners and pulsed Doppler have enabled the use of ultrasound to study the function of the venous system. The first demonstration of color Doppler was achieved by Geoff Stevenson.

Further progress in the 1970s was made with the arrival of the microchip, and the ensuing exponential increase in processing power has allowed the development of fast and powerful systems. These systems, involving digital beamforming and greater signal enhancement, have introduced new methods of interpreting and displaying data.

Ultrasound transmission tomography has further advanced specificity and sensitivity in the ultrasonography of chronic venous insufficiency.

== Bibliography ==
- Belem, Luciano Herman Juaçaba; Nogueira, Antonio Carlos Santos; Schettino, Claudio Domenico; Barros, Marcio Vinicius Lins; de Alcantara, Monica Luiza; Studart, Paulo Cesar de Carvalho; de Araújo, Paula Pimentel; do Amaral, Salomon Israel; Barretto, Simone; Guimarães, Jorge Ilha; Departamento de Ecocardiographia da Sociedade Brasileira de Cardiologia (2004). "Normatização dos equipamentos e das técnicas para a realização de exames de ultra-sonografia vascular" [Standardization of equipment and techniques for performing vascular ultrasound examinations]. Arquivos Brasileiros de Cardiologia. 82: 1–14. doi:10.1590/S0066-782X2004001200001. PMID 15264051.
- Caggiati, A.; Ricci, S. (Dec 1997). "The long saphenous vein compartment". Phlebology. 12 (3): 107–11. doi:10.1177/026835559701200307. S2CID 70465177.
- Cavezzi, A.; Labropoulos, N.; Partsch, H.; Ricci, S.; Caggiati, A.; Myers, K.; Nicolaides, A.; Smith, P.C. (2006). "Duplex Ultrasound Investigation of the Veins in Chronic Venous Disease of the Lower Limbs—UIP Consensus Document. Part II. Anatomy". European Journal of Vascular and Endovascular Surgery. 31 (3): 288–99. doi:10.1016/j.ejvs.2005.07.020. PMID 16230038.
- Cina, Alessandro; Pedicelli, Alessandro; Di Stasi, Carmine; Porcelli, Alessandra; Fiorentino, Alessandro; Cina, Gregorio; Rulli, Francesco; Bonomo, Lorenzo (2005). "Color-Doppler sonography in chronic venous insufficiency: What the radiologist should know". Current Problems in Diagnostic Radiology. 34 (2): 51–62. doi:10.1067/j.cpradiol.2004.12.001. PMID 15753879.
- Cobbold, Richard SC (2007). Foundations of Biomedical Ultrasound. New York: Oxford University Press. ISBN 978-0-19-516831-0.
- Coleridge-Smith, P.; Labropoulos, N.; Partsch, H.; Myers, K.; Nicolaides, A.; Cavezzi, A. (2006). "Duplex Ultrasound Investigation of the Veins in Chronic Venous Disease of the Lower Limbs—UIP Consensus Document. Part I. Basic Principles". European Journal of Vascular and Endovascular Surgery. 31 (1): 83–92. doi:10.1016/j.ejvs.2005.07.019. PMID 16226898.
- Dauzat, Michel (1991). Ultrasonographie vasculaire diagnostique: Théorie et pratique [Vascular diagnostic ultrasound: Theory and practice] (in French). Paris: Vigot. pp. 386–437. ISBN 978-2-7114-1104-7.
- Escribano, J.M.; Juan, J.; Bofill, R.; Rodríguez-Mori, A.; Maeso, J.; Fuentes, J.M.; Matas, M. (2005). "Haemodynamic Strategy for Treatment of Diastolic Anterograde Giacomini Varicose Veins". European Journal of Vascular and Endovascular Surgery. 30 (1): 96–101. doi:10.1016/j.ejvs.2005.03.001. PMID 15933990.
- Franceschi, Claude (1988). Théorie et Pratique de la Cure Conservatrice et Hémodynamique de l'Insuffisance Veineuse en Ambulatoire [Theory and Practice of Cure Curator and Venous hemodynamics in the outpatient clinic] (in French) (1st ed.). Précy-sous-Thil: Armançon. ISBN 2-906594-06-7.
- Franceschi, Claude; Zamboni, Paolo (2009). Principles of Venous Hemodynamics. New York: Nova Science Publishers. ISBN 978-1-60692-485-3.
- Galeandro, Aldo Innocente; Quistelli, Giovanni; Scicchitano, Pietro; Gesualdo, Michele; Zito, Annapaola; Caputo, Paola; Carbonara, Rosa; Galgano, Giuseppe; Ciciarello, Francesco; Mandolesi, Sandro; Franceschi, Claude; Ciccone, Marco Matteo (2012). "Doppler ultrasound venous mapping of the lower limbs". Vascular Health and Risk Management. 8: 59–64. doi:10.2147/VHRM.S27552. PMC 3282606. PMID 22371652.
- Labropoulos, Nicos; Tiongson, Jay; Pryor, Landon; Tassiopoulos, Apostolos K; Kang, Steven S; Ashraf Mansour, M; Baker, William H (2003). "Definition of venous reflux in lower-extremity veins". Journal of Vascular Surgery. 38 (4): 793–8. doi:10.1016/S0741-5214(03)00424-5. PMID 14560232.
- Labropoulos, Nicos; Summers, Kelli Leilani; Sanchez, Ignacio Escotto; Raffetto, Joseph (2017). "Saphenous vein wall thickness in age and venous reflux-associated remodeling in adults". Journal of Vascular Surgery: Venous and Lymphatic Disorders. 5 (2): 216–223. doi:10.1016/j.jvsv.2016.11.003. ISSN 2213-333X. PMID 28214490.
- Pierik, E.G.J.M.; Toonder, I.M.; van Urk, H.; Wittens, C.H.A. (1997). "Validation of duplex ultrasonography in detecting competent and incompetent perforating veins in patients with venous ulceration of the lower leg". Journal of Vascular Surgery. 26 (1): 49–52. doi:10.1016/S0741-5214(97)70146-0. PMID 9240321.
- Rastegar, Raymonda; Harnick, David J; Weidemann, Peter; Fuster, Valentin; Coller, Barry; Badimon, Juan J; Chesebro, James; Goldman, Martin E (2003). "Spontaneous echo contrast videodensity isflow-related and is dependent on the relative concentrations of fibrinogen and red blood cells". Journal of the American College of Cardiology. 41 (4): 603–10. doi:10.1016/S0735-1097(02)02898-X. PMID 12598072.
- Saliba, Orlando Adas; Giannini, Mariangela; Rollo, Hamilton Almeida (2007). "Métodos de diagnóstico não-invasivos para avaliação da insuficiência venosa dos membros inferiores" [Noninvasive diagnostic methods to evaluate venous insufficiency of the lower limbs]. Jornal Vascular Brasileiro (in Portuguese). 6 (3): 266–75. doi:10.1590/S1677-54492007000300010. hdl:11449/11197.
- Training in Diagnostic Ultrasound: Essentials, Principles and Standards: Report of a Who Study Group (PDF). Vol. 875. World Health Organization. 1998. pp. i-46, back cover. ISBN 978-92-4-120875-8. PMID 9659004. Archived (PDF) from the original on 2021-05-07.
- Wong, J.K.F; Duncan, J.L; Nichols, D.M (2003). "Whole-leg Duplex Mapping for Varicose Veins: Observations on Patterns of Reflux in Recurrent and Primary Legs, with Clinical Correlation". European Journal of Vascular and Endovascular Surgery. 25 (3): 267–75. doi:10.1053/ejvs.2002.1830. PMID 12623340.
