= Lower limbs venous ultrasonography =

A lower limbs venous ultrasonography may refer to:

- Ultrasonography of chronic insufficiency of the legs
- Ultrasonography of deep venous thrombosis
