= Sotomura =

Sotomura (written: 外村) is a Japanese surname. Notable people with the surname include:

- Joanna Sotomura (born 1987), American actress
- Koji Sotomura (外村 康二, born 1958), Japanese gymnast

== See also ==
- Satomura
