= Ultrasonography of deep vein thrombosis =

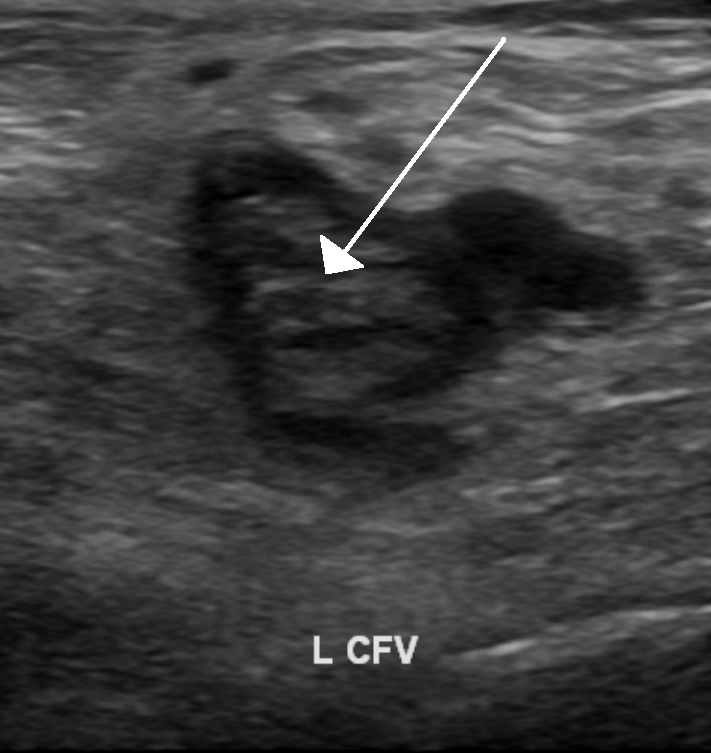
- Deep vein thrombosis of the common femoral vein, seen with the probe in a transversal position.
- Purpose: focuses primarily on femoral and popliteal vein,

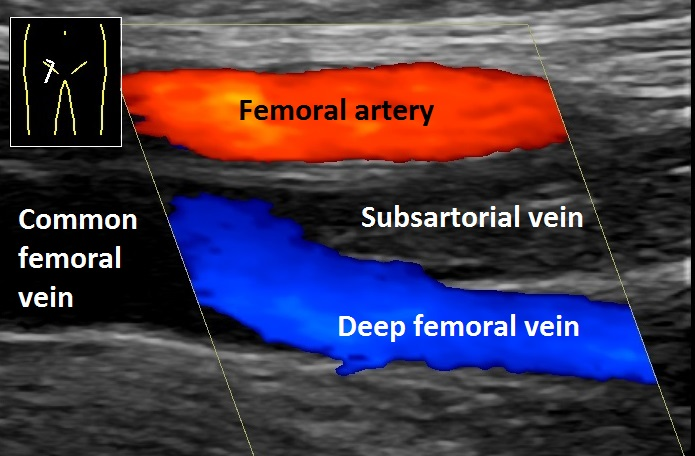
Doppler ultrasonography showing absence of flow and hyperechogenic content in deep vein thrombosis of the subsartorial vein.

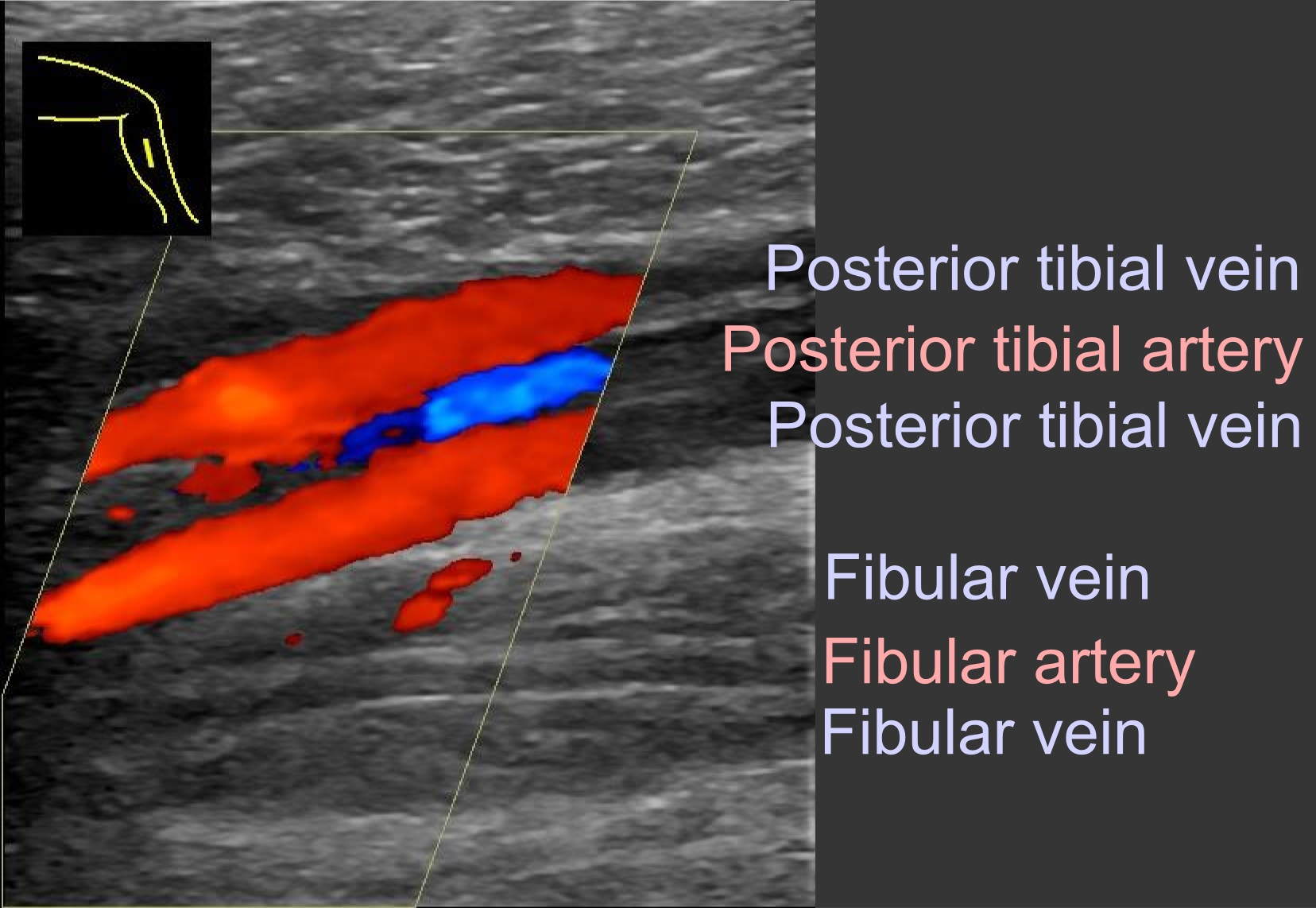
Coronal plane, seen from medial side of lower leg, showing thrombosis of the fibular veins, with hyperechoic content and only marginal blood flow.

Ultrasonography in suspected deep vein thrombosis focuses primarily on the femoral vein and the popliteal vein, because thrombi in these veins are associated with the greatest risk of harmful pulmonary embolism.

== Medical uses ==
The risk of deep vein thrombosis can be estimated by Wells score.

Lower limbs venous ultrasonography is also indicated in cases of suspected pulmonary embolism where a CT pulmonary angiogram is negative but a high clinical suspicion of pulmonary embolism remains. It may identify a deep vein thrombosis in up to 50% of people with pulmonary embolism.

Knee or hip replacement are, by themselves, not indications to perform the procedure.

Serial follow-up the ultrasound exam is not necessary after an initially complete, normal study in individuals with DVT symptoms who have suspected pulmonary embolism and nondiagnostic ventilation/perfusion scans .

== Technique and findings ==
Unlike arterial ultrasonography, venous ultrasonography is carried out with the probe in a transversal position, (perpendicular to the vein axis), displaying cross-sections of the veins. All collateral veins are better detected this way, including perforator veins, but of most importance is the detection of venous thrombosis. The most reliable sign of thrombosis (even when a good image and color is present) is the absence of compressibility - A vein cannot be compressed when the blood is in a solid state, as with a thrombus, in the same way that a rubber pipe cannot be compressed if the water inside is frozen. However, if the probe is parallel to the vein axis, when the examiner compresses it, the probe can slide to the right or to the left giving a false negative for thrombosis as the probe has moved away and the vein will not then be evident. Nevertheless, when the examiner needs to show the head thrombus in a printout, the probe will be presented parallel to the vein axis.

=== Echogenicity ===
A very recently formed thrombus is not very solid, it will have a low echogenicity, and will be seen as a black area in the gray-scale image and will be hardly visible. When the examiner uses color, the imaging is not much improved. A thrombus may not be evident in the scan. Also a vein lumen may show echoes without the presence of a thrombus. The location of the thrombus and its detail will inform of the seriousness of the condition. In a deep vein thrombosis (DVT), or in a superficial vein thrombosis where the thrombus is floating, an emergency situation will be indicated. If the thrombus is near to the sapheno-femoral junction there will be a high risk of a pulmonary embolism occurring.

=== Compression ===
The inability to compress the vein is one of the more reliable indications of venous thrombosis. There is a simplified technique called "compression ultrasonography" which can be used for quick DVT diagnosis, mainly for the common femoral vein and the popliteal vein. It is very useful in an emergency situation and is performed just by vein compression using transducer pressure. Compression ultrasonography has both high sensitivity and specificity for detecting DVT in symptomatic patients. Results are not reliable when the patient is symptomless and must be checked carefully. For example, in high risk post-operative patients, mainly after orthopedic surgery where there is already lower limb pain and edema following surgery, thrombi can be localized in the calf veins and often these are not completely occlusive. In this situation a complete examination is mandatory.

=== Doppler ===
Doppler ultrasonography of venous blood flow that correlates with respiration can be diagnostic of the absence of deep vein thrombosis.

== See also ==
- Ultrasonography of chronic venous insufficiency of the legs, mainly targeting superficial veins.
