= Satomura =

Satomura (written: 里村) is a Japanese surname. Notable people with the surname include:

- Meiko Satomura (born 1979), Japanese professional wrestler
- Shigeo Satomura (里村 茂夫) (1919–1960), Japanese physicist
- Satomura Shokyu (里村 昌休) (1510–1552), Japanese poet
