= Gene Strandness =

American physician, university professor and research scientist

Donald Eugene Strandness
- Born: September 22, 1928; Bowman, North Dakota
- Died: January 7, 2002 (aged 73); Bellevue, Washington
- Citizenship: United States
- Education: B.S., Pacific Lutheran University, 1950; M.D., University of Washington School of Medicine, 1954
- Known for: Pioneered the field of vascular ultrasound
- Scientific career
- Fields: Medicine; Vascular ltrasound
- Workplaces: University of Washington Medical Center

Donald Eugene Strandness (September 22, 1928 – January 7, 2002) was an American physician, university professor, and research scientist. Dr. Strandness, known as Gene, was influential in the development of Doppler ultrasound as a diagnostic tool in vascular medicine, and did research that established much of the clinical grading criteria in the field of vascular ultrasound.

Strandness was recognized as a pioneer in the field of vascular surgery, and as a "founding father" of the University of Washington School of Medicine and Medical Center.

== Early life and education ==
Strandness was born on September 22, 1928, in Bowman, North Dakota. Facing economic hardship, his family left North Dakota and moved to Olympia, Washington, when he was 10 years old. He attended Olympia High School, graduating in 1946. He did his undergraduate studies at Pacific Lutheran University in Tacoma, Washington. He went on to study medicine at the University of Washington School of Medicine, receiving his M.D. in 1954.

== Pioneering role in vascular ultrasound ==
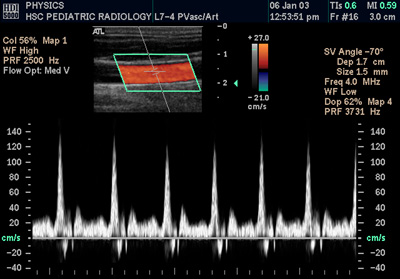
SpectralDopplerA

In the early 1960s, while a resident at the University of Washington Medical Center, Strandness became interested in, and recognized the importance of, vascular physiology and hemodynamics (the flow of blood). He envisioned the potential uses of Doppler ultrasound as a tool in the diagnosis of vascular disease, and upon completing his residency began his collaborations with bio-engineers Robert Rushmer, Dean Franklin and Donald Baker and their team at the University of Washington. Their research, and the equipment they developed were used in clinical trials that validated Strandness' thinking.

In 1967, Strandness introduced the first Doppler ultrasound instrument for clinical use in an article he co-wrote, "Ultrasonic Flow Detection: A Useful Technic In The Evaluation of Peripheral Vascular Disease", published in the American Journal of Surgery. The article, and Strandness' belief in using Doppler ultrasound to detect peripheral vascular disease, was met with skepticism.

In the 1970s, Strandness and the bio-engineering group at the University of Washington, turned their attention to the use of real-time B-mode scanning. This type of ultrasound would enable physicians to see the vascular structures in real-time. Further research allowed B-mode imaging to be combined with Doppler ultrasound, providing real-time views of the vascular structures and simultaneous hemodynamic information. Today, this type of duplex scanning is used in a variety of ultrasound specialties.

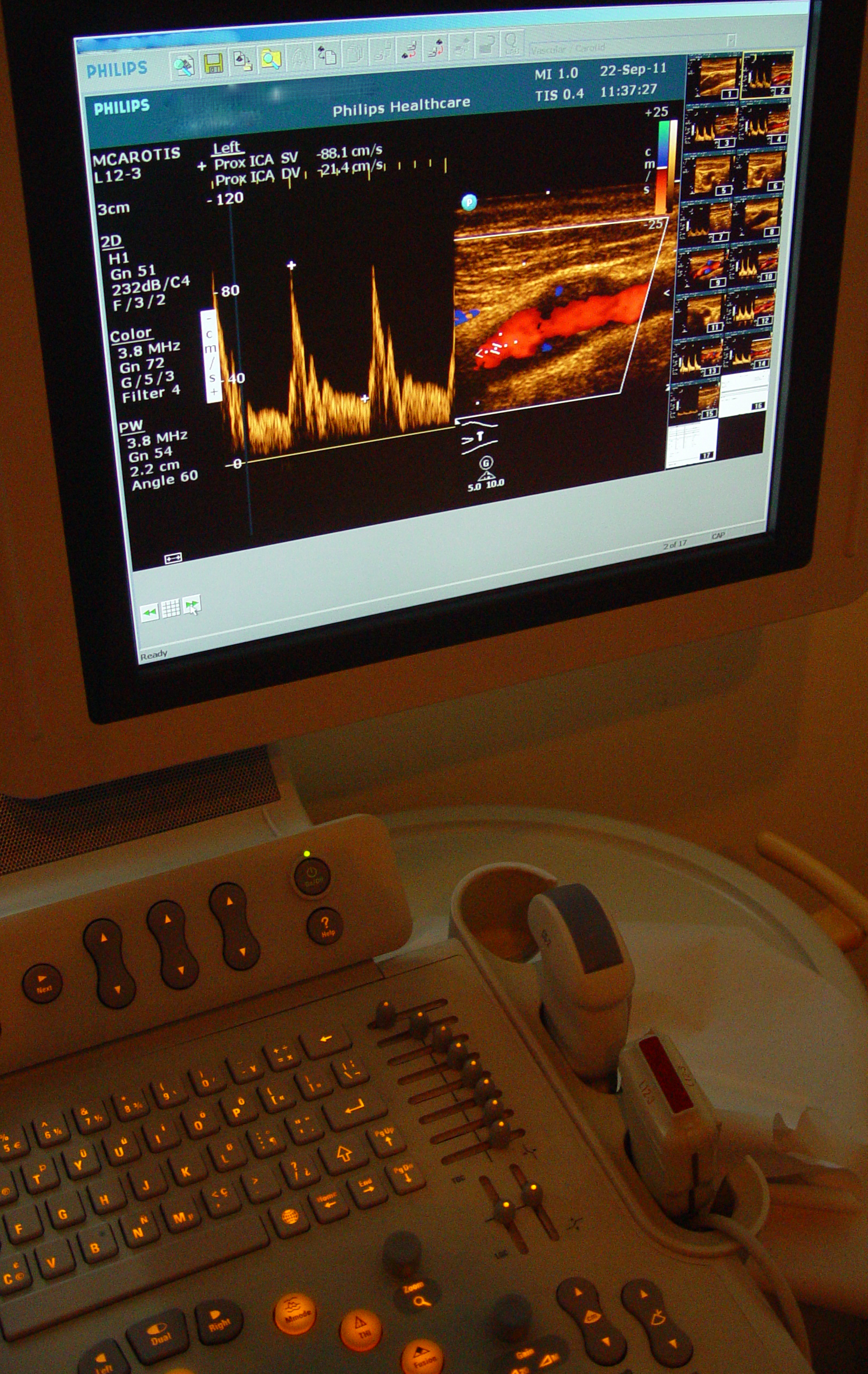
CarotidDoppler1

== Late career ==
Throughout his career, Strandness taught and conducted vascular research at University of Washington. He retired with emeritus status in 1995, but continued to run the university's vascular research lab. He was actively engaged in research and continued writing, including an updated version of his work, "Duplex Scanning in Vascular Disorders". He saw patients until shortly before his death in 2002.

== Legacy ==
Prior to Strandness' work, the only vascular imaging available to physicians would have been arteriograms, x-rays read from radiopaque dyes injected directly into the bloodstream. Initially, the idea of using ultrasound imaging was met with resistance. Eventually, however, younger physicians were more receptive and accepting of the technology Strandness and his team developed. Although arteriograms are sometimes still used, most physicians today rely upon the non-invasive procedures and real-time information provided by duplex ultrasound scans.

Based on the technologies and practices Dr. Strandness developed, vascular ultrasound is an established field. Technologists, known as vascular sonographers, specialize in this branch of ultrasound scanning.

== See also ==
- Cardiovascular surgery
- Duplex ultrasonography
- Medical ultrasonography
- Renal artery stenosis
- University of Washington
