= Mickey Mouse sign =

Medical sign

Mickey Mouse sign is a medical sign resembling the head of Mickey Mouse, the Walt Disney character. Presented for the very first time at the CHIVA's Meeting, Berlin 2002 by Dr. Lurdes Cerol, this sign has been described as the image at the groin when a dilated accessory saphenous vein (ASV) exists: the common femoral vein (CFV) represents the head of Mickey Mouse while the great saphenous vein (GSV) and the dilated accessory saphenous vein (ASV) represent the ears. The presence of a Mickey Mouse sign has been a great diagnostic clue to check ASV insufficiency.

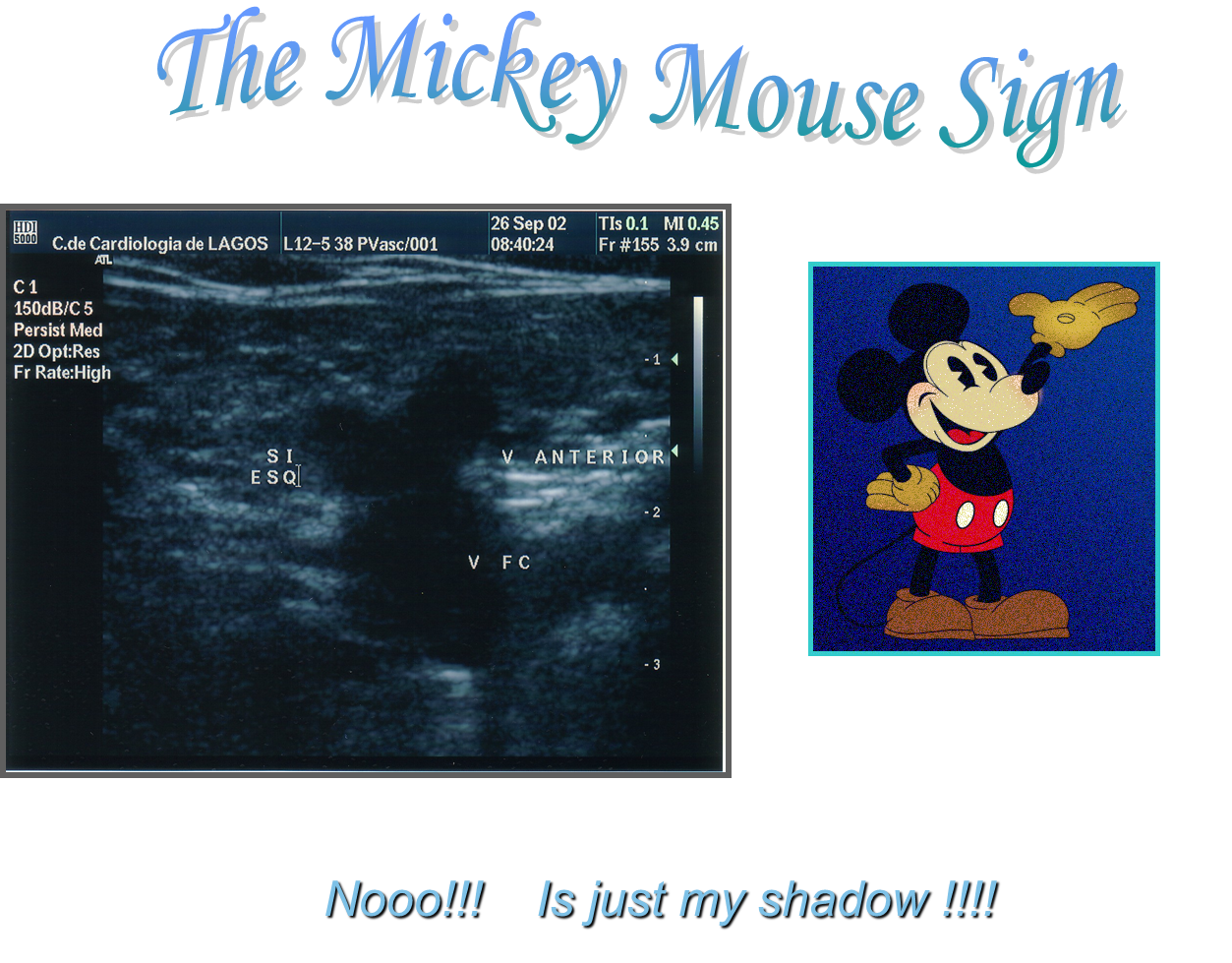
Mickey Mouse Sign, the original slide, at CHIVA's Meeting, Berlin 2002"

Mickey Mouse sign in the saphenofemoral junction, showing GSV, a dilated ASV and CFV

Some authors, inspired by this sign, described an ecographic "Mickey Mouse View" at the saphenofemoral junction in the groin: the common femoral vein (CFV) represents the head of Mickey Mouse while the great saphenous vein (GSV) and the accessory saphenous vein (ASV) represent the ears.

But it can be seen in different regions of the body:

- Midbrain of progressive supranuclear palsy (PSP).
- Polyostotic Paget's disease (Paget's disease affecting multiple bones); a bone scintigraphy with technetium-99m methylene bisphosphonate shows increased uptake at the sites of disease activity. Increased scintigraphic uptake in the body and spine of the vertebrae resembles the head of Mickey Mouse.
- The portal triad in biliary ultrasound scans, with the portal vein comprising Mickey's head and the common bile duct and hepatic artery his right and left ears, respectively.
- Pelvic Mickey Mouse sign: bilateral inguinal vesical hernia on transverse axial imaging.
- Dysmorphic Mickey Mouse RBCs: RBCs with irregular cell walls and migration of hemoglobin into some areas creating the shape of Mickey Mouse ears. The presence of these dysmorphic cells in urine may indicate intraglomerular haemorrhage.
- Ureteropelvic junction obstruction (UPJO)
