= Perforator vein =

Veins that perforate the deep fascia of muscles

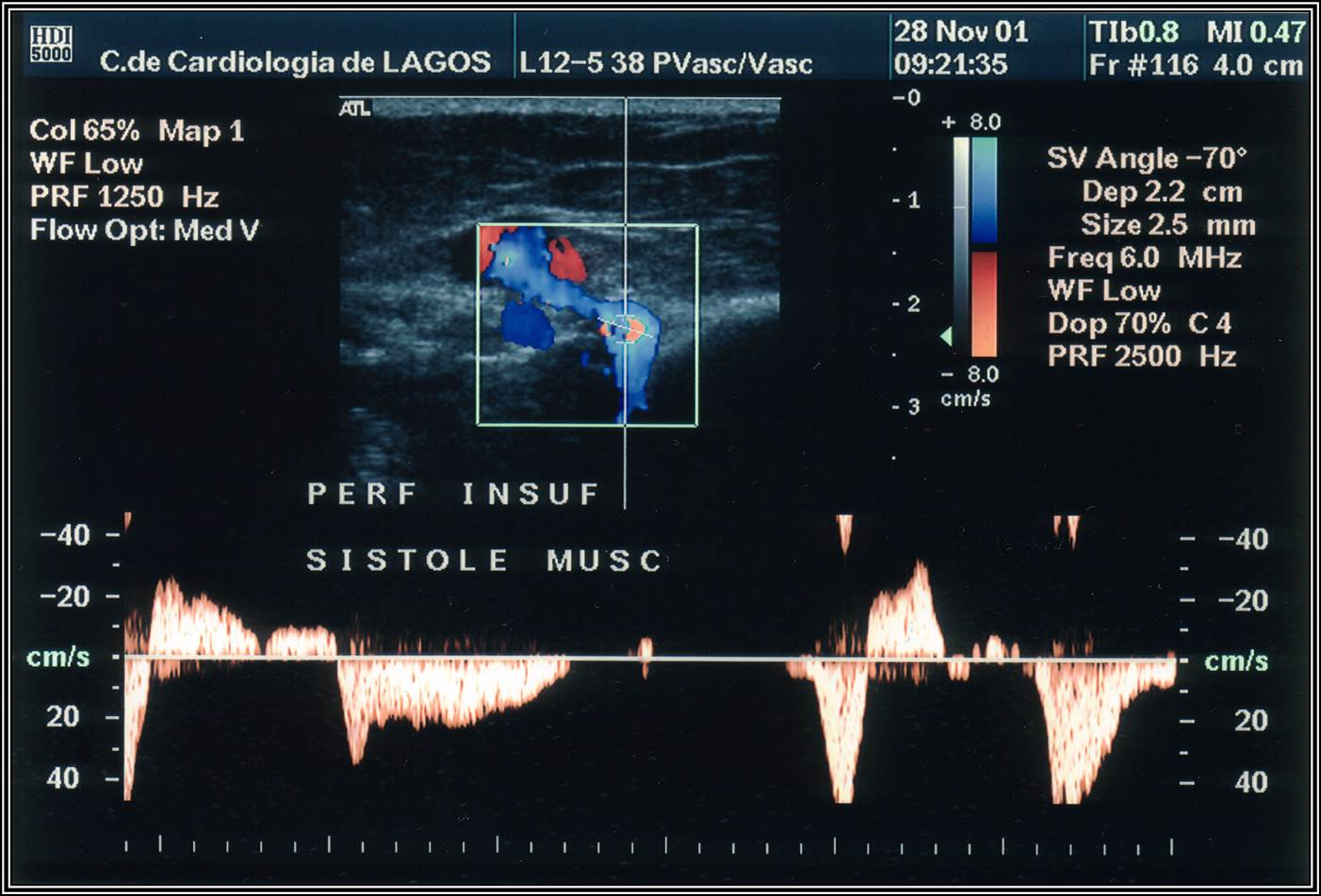
- Insufficiency caused by incompetent perforator valve

Details

Identifiers
- Latin: venae perforantes
- TA2: 3908

Perforator veins are so called because they perforate the deep fascia of muscles, to connect the superficial veins to the deep veins where they drain.

Perforator veins play an essential role in maintaining normal blood draining. They have valves which prevent blood flowing back (regurgitation) from deep to superficial veins in muscular systole or contraction.

== Location ==
Diagram showing named veins

Perforator veins exist along the length of the lower limb, in greater number in the leg (anatomical ref to below knee) than in the thigh.

Some veins are named after the physician who first described them:

- Dodd's perforator at the inferior 1/3 of the thigh
- Boyd's perforator at the knee level
- Cockett's perforators at the inferior 2/3 of the leg (usually there are three: superior medium and inferior Cockett perforators)

Others have the name of the deep vein where they drain:

- Medial gastrocnemius perforator, draining into the gastrocnemius vein
- Fibular perforators, usually two, one superior near the lateral aspect of the knee and one inferior at the lateral aspect of the ankle

When the valves of perforator veins become incompetent they can cause venous reflux when the muscles contract. This has been explained by Mark Whiteley as "active venous reflux". The resulting reflux can cause a rapid deterioration in an existing varicose disease and be responsible for the development of venous ulcers.

In the past, when varicose vein surgery is undertaken, the surgeon carefully ligated all perforators, but some believe that you can use conservative techniques to treat varicose disease use perforators to drain the superficial venous system. In this case, lower limbs venous ultrasonography plays an important role in evaluating which continent perforators can be used.

However, increasing evidence (see below) is starting to favor the treatment of incompetent perforator veins by minimally invasive techniques such as transluminal occlusion of perforators (TRLOP).

== Clinical significance ==
Whether incompetent perforator veins (IPVs) require treatment or not is controversial, particularly when associated with the treatment of varicose veins. However research has shown that there is a clear association between the presence of IPVs and recurrent varicose veins.

Before 1985, the ligation of IPVs needed open surgery. In 1985, G. Hauer described the Sub-fascial endoscopic perforator vein surgery (SEPS) technique allowing IPVs to be clipped through a small incision.

SEPS was superseded in 2001 by minimally invasive laparoscopy, a technique using very small incisions, called transluminal occlusion of perforators (TRLOP) which by 2009 had shown to be as effective as SEPS in a 5-year study. As TRLOP can be performed under local anaesthetic and under ultrasound guidance, the advantages over the more invasive and painful SEPS were clear.

In 2007 there was an attempt to rename TRLOP as percutaneous ablation of perforators (PAP) but PAPs was seen to be merely a copy of the already described TRLOP procedure.

== See also ==
- Ultrasonography of chronic venous insufficiency of the legs
