= Anterior accessory saphenous vein =

Large blood vessel

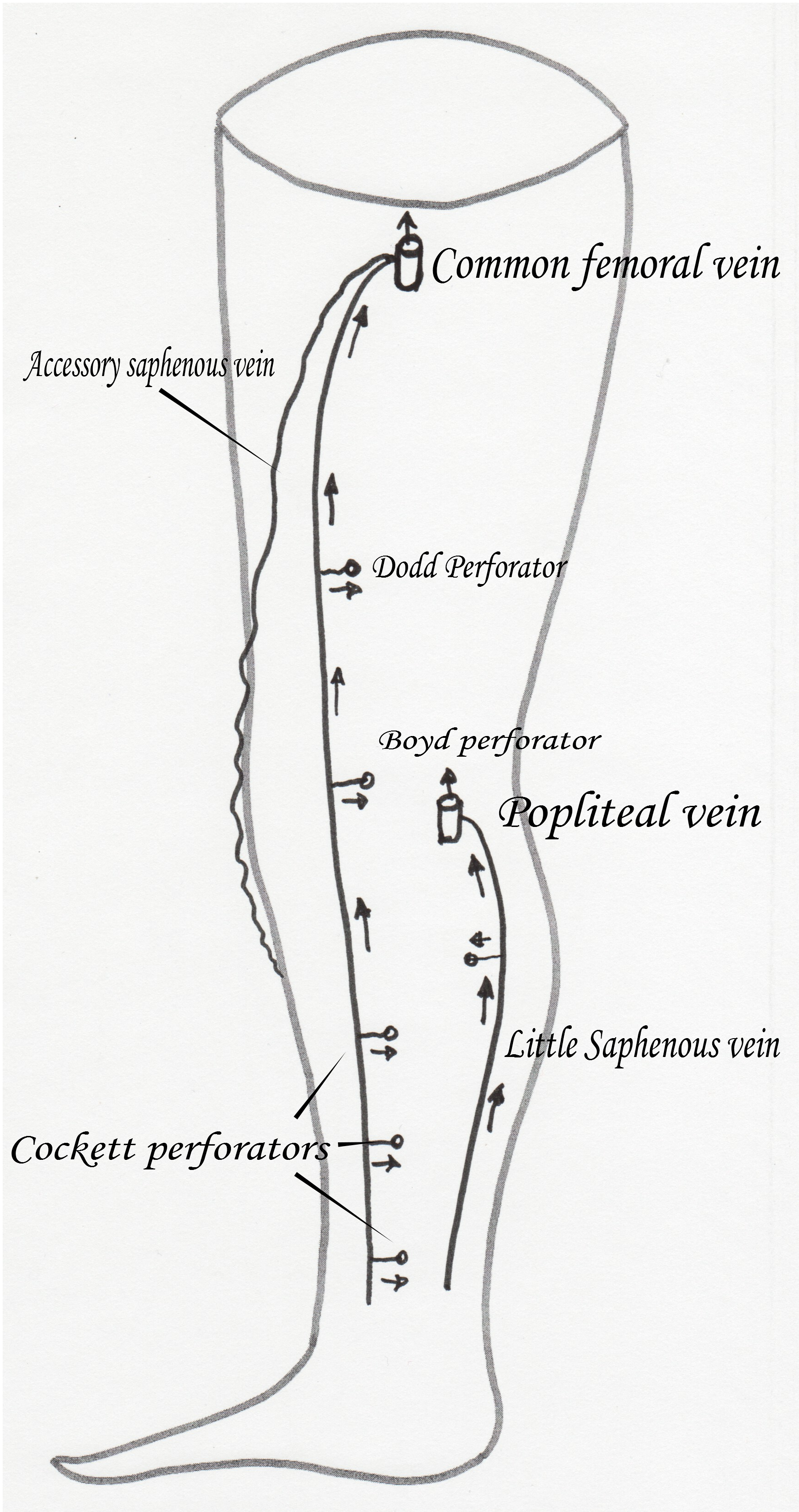
- Anterior accessory saphenous vein

Details
- Drains to: Great saphenous vein

Identifiers
- Latin: vena saphena magna accessoria anterior
- TA98: A12.3.11.007
- TA2: 5068
- FMA: 44320

The anterior accessory saphenous vein is a special anterior tributary of the great saphenous vein (GSV), draining the antero-lateral face of the thigh. However, in recent times experts have suggested dropping the term "Accessory" and simply calling this the Anterior Saphenous Vein (ASV)

This change occurred in 2024 when there was a significant announcement by a task force endorsed by the American Venous Forum, the American Vein and Lymphatic Society (AVLS) and the UIP to drop the term "accessory."

They explained in a series of publications and presentations that it became evident to many specialists caring for venous patients that there was a lack of clarity regarding the terminology of the anterior accessory saphenous vein. The term “accessory” implied that the vein was a superficial tributary. However, its anatomic features, accepted treatment approaches, and clinical outcomes after treatment supported its role as a truncal vein, similar to the great saphenous vein (GSV) and small saphenous vein (SSV).

This discordance led to confusion about the optimal treatment modalities and restrictive payer coverage inconsistencies. Therefore, there was momentum to develop a process to evaluate whether the terminology should evolve to provide more clarity on this distinction. This led to the formation of a multispecialty working group with representatives from the AVLS, AVF, and UIP. Ultimately, a consensus was made to drop the term “accessory” and simply use the term anterior saphenous vein (ASV).

== Structure ==
Usually it joins GSV very near the saphenous-femoral junction at the saphenous arch or can drain directly in the femoral vein. It can drain below the saphenous arch or in a GSV tributary. Sometimes it can drain in the external pudendal vein (which can communicate with an ovarian vein) and be the reason of a varicose disease of the thigh secondary to pelvic varicose disease. At the superior 1/3 of the thigh it is located under the superficial fascia, like the GSV, but becomes very superficial below this level. In contrast with other tributaries, its wall is histologically saphenous-type with a thick media, running parallel and external to the GSV.

The vein can be identified near the saphenous ostium by a typical ultrasonographic image the so-called Mickey mouse sign (the 2 ears will be the GSV and the ASV, the head is the common femoral vein).

When the ultrasonography is performed, we can see it running across the anterior face of the thigh in a plan outside the femoral vessels, the GSV being at the inside of those vessels.

== Clinical relevance ==
When insufficient, usually it tries to drain in the superior peroneal perforator at the external face of the knee, but it can reach the leg at its lower 1/3 and, drain in the lower peroneal perforator.

When treated properly the patient can be considered cured from his disease because this vein is just a collateral one, and most of the time is the only sick vein over all the superficial venous system.

The importance of this vein comes from the frequent confusion between it and the GSV made at ultrasonographic examination. This confusion can allow to a medical error and finishes on a stripping of the real GSV. So, its presence is described as a reason for stripping postoperative recurrences.

== Image gallery ==
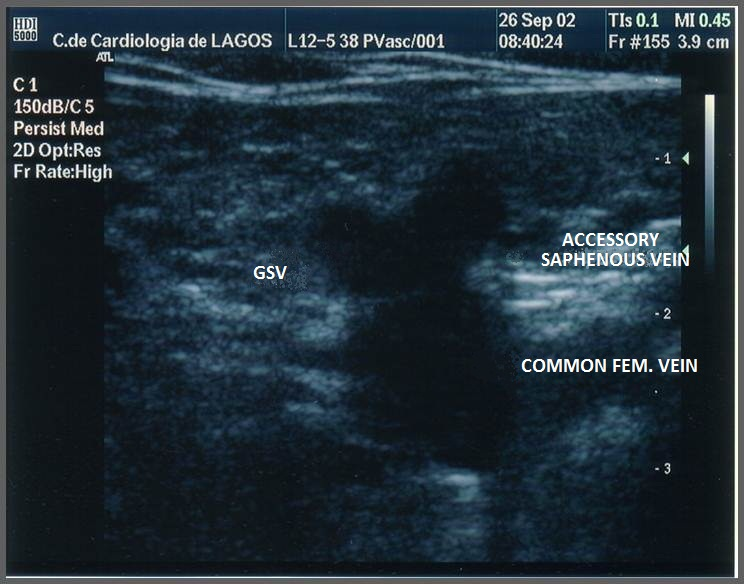
AASV at sapheno-femoral junction the "Mickey mouse sign"

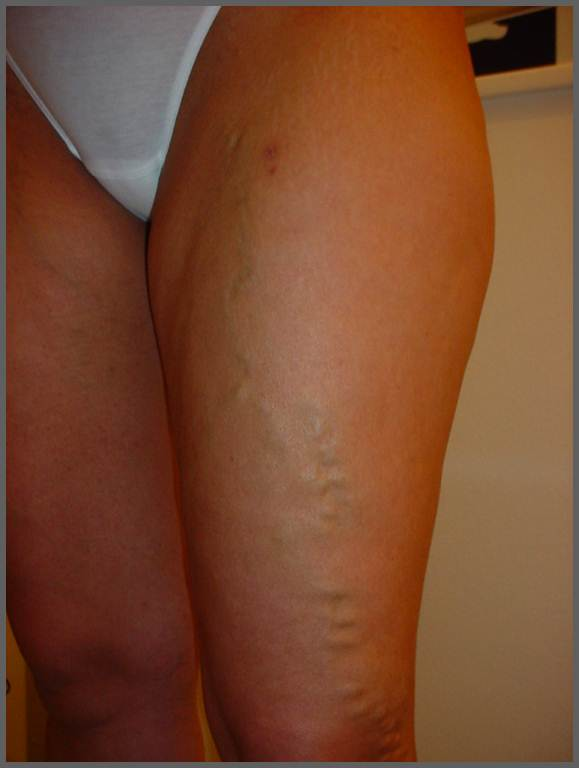
Varicose Anterior accessory saphenous vein

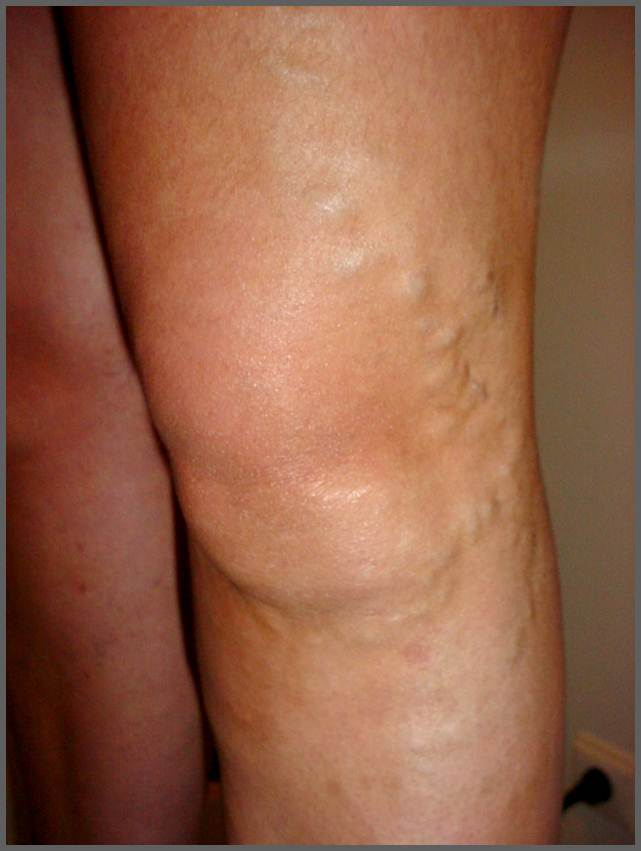
Varicose Anterior accessory saphenous vein at the knee

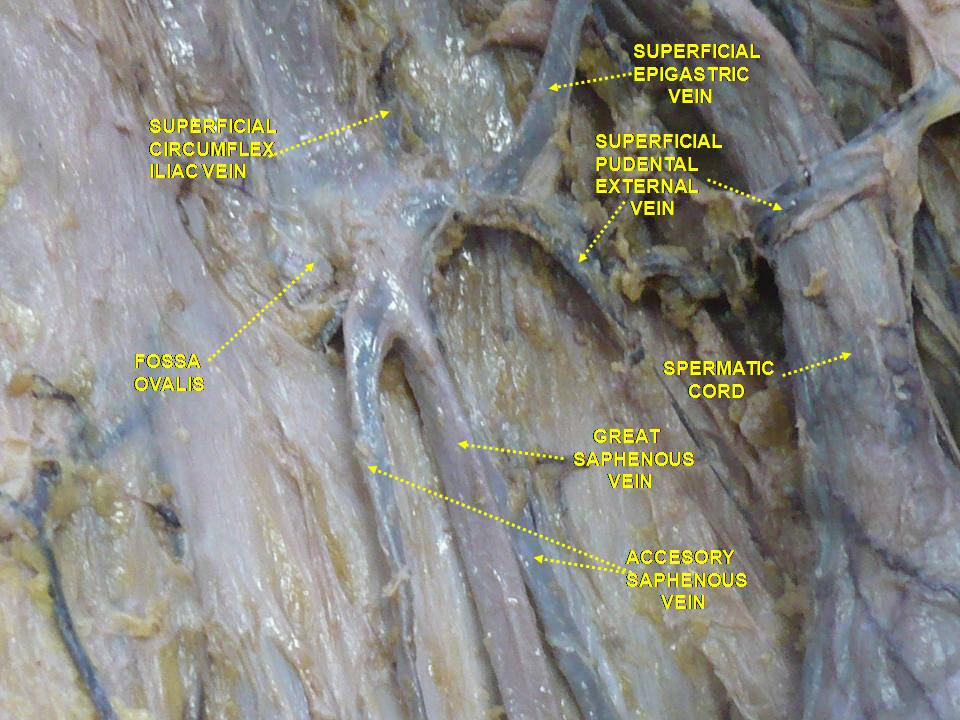
Superficial veins oflower limb.Superficial dissection.Anterior view.
