= Shigeo Satomura =

Japanese physicist

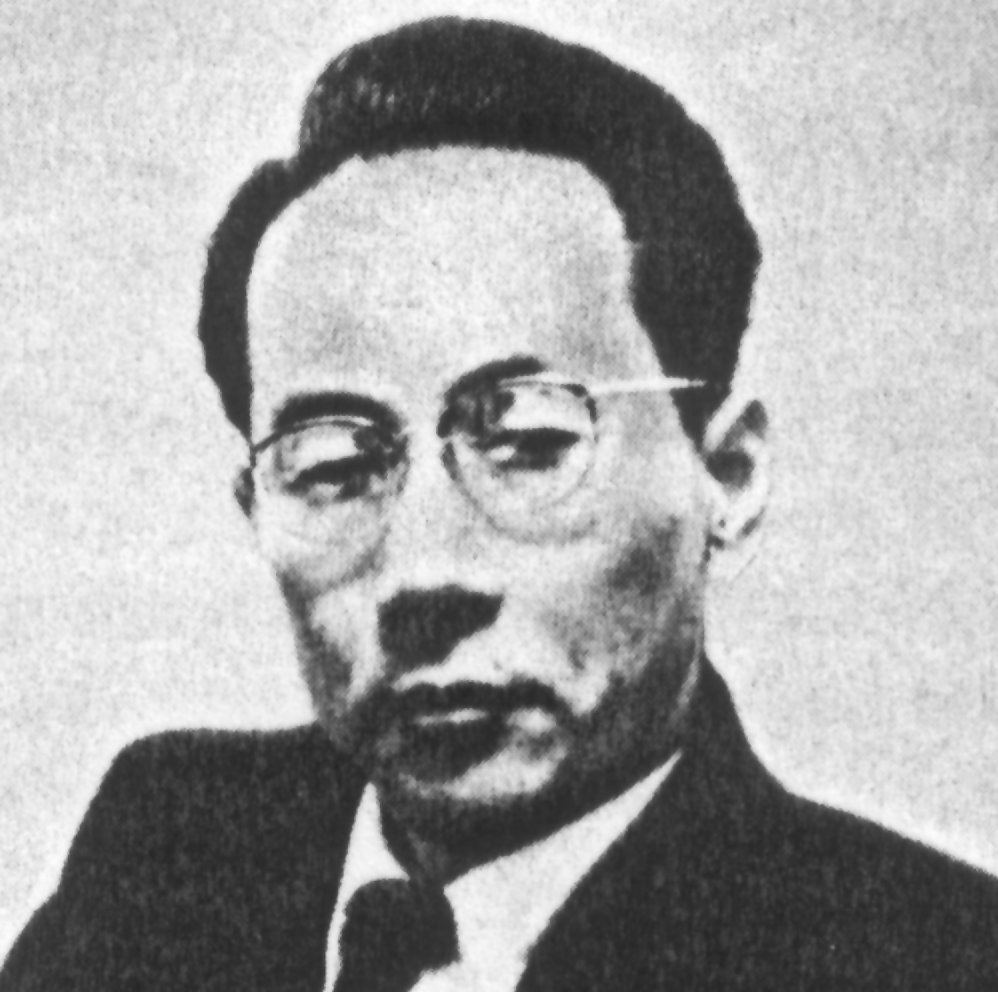
- Born: 1919; Osaka
- Died: 1960 (aged 40–41)
- Scientific career
- Fields: Medical physics

Shigeo Satomura (里村 茂夫, Satomura Shigeo; 1919–1960) was a Japanese physicist credited with introducing the ultrasonic Doppler techniques to practical medical diagnostics in the 1950s. These techniques made possible non-invasive monitoring of blood flow in the human body.

== Life ==
Satomura was born in 1919 in Osaka and spent most of his career at various institutions of Osaka University. In 1944 he defended his PhD at the School of Physics and then worked at the Institute of Scientific and Industrial Research. In 1952 he became assistant professor and received a Doctor of Medicine degree in 1960. He died from a sudden subarachnoid hemorrhage at the Osaka University Hospital in the same year and was promoted to the rank of professor posthumously.

== Research ==
Satomura initially worked in areas of physics and in 1955 applied microwave and ultrasonic radiation to study defects in industrial materials. His supervisor, Kinjiro Okabe, advised him to extend those techniques to medical diagnosis of the human body. He teamed with cardiac physicians of the Osaka University Hospital and attempted to monitor the pulsations of heart and blood vessels. In December 1955 they published their first measurements of the Doppler shift of ultrasonic signals from a beating heart irradiated by 3 MHz waves.

This work was extended to design a device measuring the Doppler shifts from pulsating blood vessels, which was described in the Journal of the Acoustical Society of America in 1957. A commercial version of this device was launched in 1959 by the NEC as the "Doppler Rheograph". The results obtained with the prototype Doppler flowmeter became the core of the doctoral thesis submitted in November 1959 by Satomura. His collaborator Ziro Kaneko, a neuropsychiatrist, proposed to use this technique for monitoring blood flow in the human brain to distinguish the Alzheimer and cerebrovascular diseases. They started this work in July 1958 and in the same year detected ultrasonic Doppler signals from arteries and veins at the skin surface. The results were presented in October 1958 at the meeting of the Acoustic Society of Japan and published in 1959 in the Journal of the Acoustic Society of Japan. They were popularized in 1959 by the Mainichi Shimbun, a leading newspaper in Japan.

By early 1960, Satomura completed two other studies on an "Ultrasonic Doppler Cardiograph" and "Ultrasonic Blood Rheograph". These results were presented by Kaneko in the same year at the Third International Conference on Medical Electronics. Satomura and Kaneko concluded that their Doppler flowmeter could monitor various types of blood flow, via the intensity of the Doppler noise signal, but it could not provide absolute flow values. Their results launched the field of non-invasive spectral analysis of blood flow, including Doppler echocardiography and Doppler sonography. Although a similar device named a "pulsed ultrasound flowmeter" was designed by the Dean Franklin group at the University of Washington, Seattle, USA, its sensor had to be directly attached to the blood vessel wall. The Franklin group reported remote Doppler sensing of blood flow only in 1966, citing the work by Satomura and Kaneko.
