= Doppler ultrasonography =

Ultrasound imaging of the movement of tissues and body fluids using the Doppler effect

Doppler ultrasonography, duplex ultrasonography
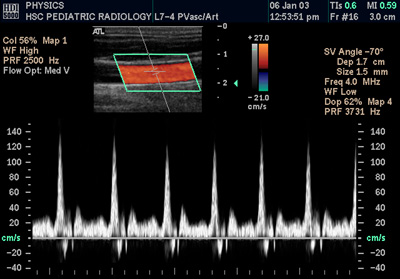
- Spectral duplex scan of the common carotid artery
- MeSH: D018616
- MedlinePlus: 003433

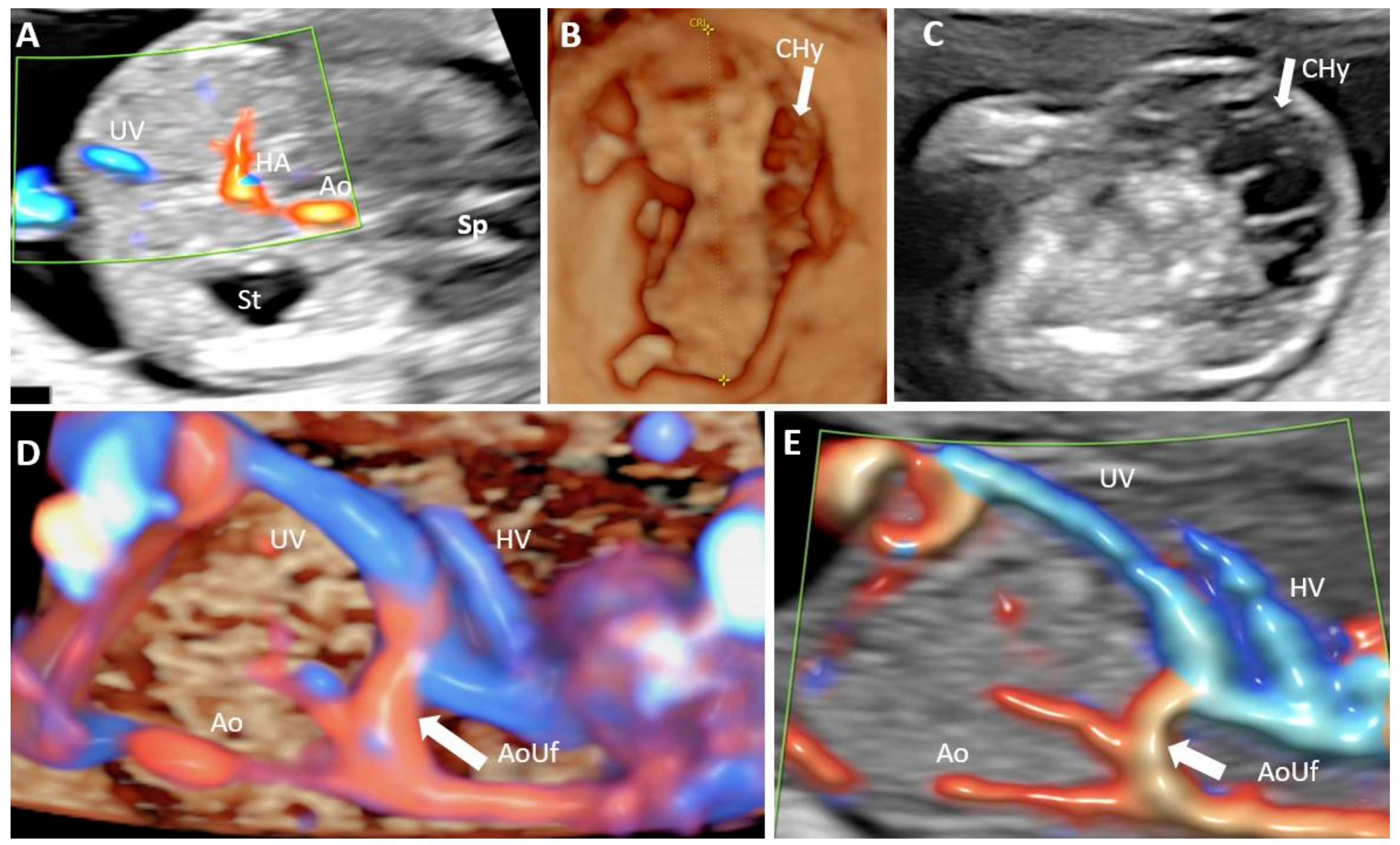
Absence of the portal system in a first trimester case associated with hygroma and aorto-umbilical fistula. (A): Transverse plane of the upper abdomen with color Doppler applied, showing umbilical cord insertion, stomach, the prominent hepatic artery and no afferent liver venous perfusion; (B): midsagittal plane reconstructed from a three-dimensional volume acquisition were the crown-rump length is measured and fetal cystic hygroma can be observed (white arrow); (C): transverse sonographic view of the neck septated nuchal cystic mass (white arrow); (D): 4D STIC showing in the longitudinal view of the fetal abdomen an abnormal connection (white arrow) between umbilical vein and aorta. (E): same aspects as (D), using two dimensional color Doppler assessment. UV umbilical vein, HA hepatic artery, Ao aorta, St stomach, Sp spine, CHy cystic hygroma, AoUf aorto-umbilical fistula.

Doppler ultrasonography is medical ultrasonography that historically points to the Doppler effect to perform imaging of the movement of tissues and body fluids (usually blood), and their relative velocity to the probe. Continuous wave Doppler is based on the calculation of the frequency shift of a particular sample volume, for example, flow in an artery or a jet of blood flow over a heart valve, its speed and direction can be determined and visualized. Other so-called Doppler modes (colour "Doppler", both velocity and power, as well as spectral "Doppler") are calculating velocities from pulse-to-pulse signal phase-shifts as opposed to the Doppler effect.

Duplex ultrasonography sometimes refers to Doppler ultrasonography or spectral Doppler ultrasonography. Doppler ultrasonography consists of two components: brightness mode (B-mode) showing anatomy of the organs, and Doppler mode (showing blood flow) superimposed on the B-mode. Meanwhile, spectral Doppler ultrasonography consists of three components: B-mode, Doppler mode, and spectral waveform displayed at the lower half of the image. Therefore, "duplex ultrasonography" is a misnomer for spectral Doppler ultrasonography, and more exact name should be "triplex ultrasonography".

This is particularly useful in cardiovascular studies (sonography of the vascular system and heart) and essential in many areas such as determining reverse blood flow in the liver vasculature in portal hypertension.

== Operation ==
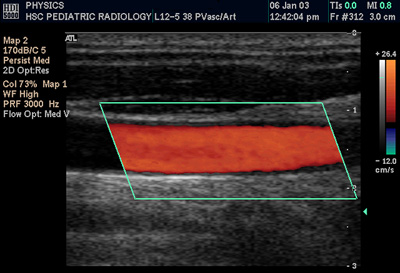
Duplex scan of the common carotid artery

Colour Doppler shows the direction of the blood flow in red or blue (either towards or away from the transducer). Meanwhile, spectral Doppler not only shows the direction of blood flow, it also shows the phases (pulsatility) and acceleration of the blood flow. Any sudden changes in direction of blood flow produces audible sounds on the ultrasound machine.

In spectral Doppler, the y-axis shows the direction and velocity of the flow. Meanwhile, the x-axis (as known as "baseline") shows the flow over time. The gradient at any point on the waveform would therefore shows the acceleration of the flow. In "antegrade" flow, the blood flows according to the normal flow within the circulatory system (e.g. veins flow towards the heart while arteries flows away from the heart). In "retrograde" flow, the flow would reverse (e.g. veins flow away from heart or arteries flow towards the heart). However, "retrograde" flow can be both abnormal or normal. For example, in portal hypertension, there is an abnormal portal venous flow where it flows away from the liver (hepatofugal flow) instead of the normal flow towards liver (hepatopetal flow). In jugular venous pressure waveform of the internal jugular vein, the retrograde "a" waveform is a normal flow due to right atrium contraction. Both antegrade or retrograde flow can be either towards or away from the probe transducer, depending on the position of the probe relative to the blood flow. Blood flow toward the transducer would appear above the baseline while blood flows away from the transducer will appear below the baseline. Waveform of the flow can be classified as: pulsatile (as in arteries), phasic (as in veins), non-phasic (as in diseased veins), and aphasic (no flow). Spectral broadening (thickness of the waveform) increases from large vessels (plug flow) to medium vessels (laminar flow) to small/stenotic/diseased vessels (turbulent flow) due to a larger variety of blood with different ranges of velocities in those with turbulent flow.

Upstream and downstream stenosis refers to the location of the stenotic site relative to the ultrasound probe. Upstream stenosis means the location of stenosis is located before the ultrasound probe. It causes a marked decrease in peak systolic velocity when compared to end-diastolic velocity, causing marked reduction in resistance index. Meanwhile, downstream stenosis is located after the ultrasound probe. Thus, there is only a slight reduction in peak systolic velocity and end-diastolic velocity (where end-diastolic velocity is reduced more than peak systolic velocity), resulting in an increased resistance index.

Power Doppler is a non directional Doppler.

All modern ultrasound scanners use pulsed Doppler to measure velocity, also known as gated systems. Pulsed wave instruments transmit and receive series of pulses at the pulse-repetition frequency (PRF). In gated systems, the Doppler frequency shift of each pulse can not be determined, therefore the relative phase changes between successive pulses are used to obtain an alternative frequency shift (since frequency is the rate of change of phase). These relative phase changes can lead to aliasing and are commonly mitigated by changing the PRF. The major advantage of pulsed wave Doppler (PW Doppler) over continuous wave (CW Doppler) is that distance information is obtained (time between transmitted and received pulses multiplied by sound velocity equals distance) and gain correction is applied. The disadvantage of pulsed Doppler is that the measurements can suffer from aliasing. The terms Doppler ultrasound and Doppler sonography have been accepted to apply to both pulsed and continuous Doppler systems, despite the different mechanisms by which the velocity is measured.

There are no standards for displaying color Doppler. Some laboratories show arteries as red and veins as blue, as medical illustrators usually show them, even though some vessels may have portions flowing toward and portions flowing away from the transducer. This results in the illogical appearance of a vessel being partly a vein and partly an artery. Other laboratories use red to indicate flow toward the transducer and blue away from the transducer. Still other laboratories display the Doppler color map in accordance with published data, with red shift representing longer wavelengths (scattered) from blood flowing away from the transducer and blue representing the shorter wavelengths from blood flowing toward the transducer. Because of this confusion and lack of standards, the sonographer must understand the underlying physics of color Doppler and the physiology of normal and abnormal blood flow in the human body (see Red shift).

== Uses ==
=== Transcranial ===
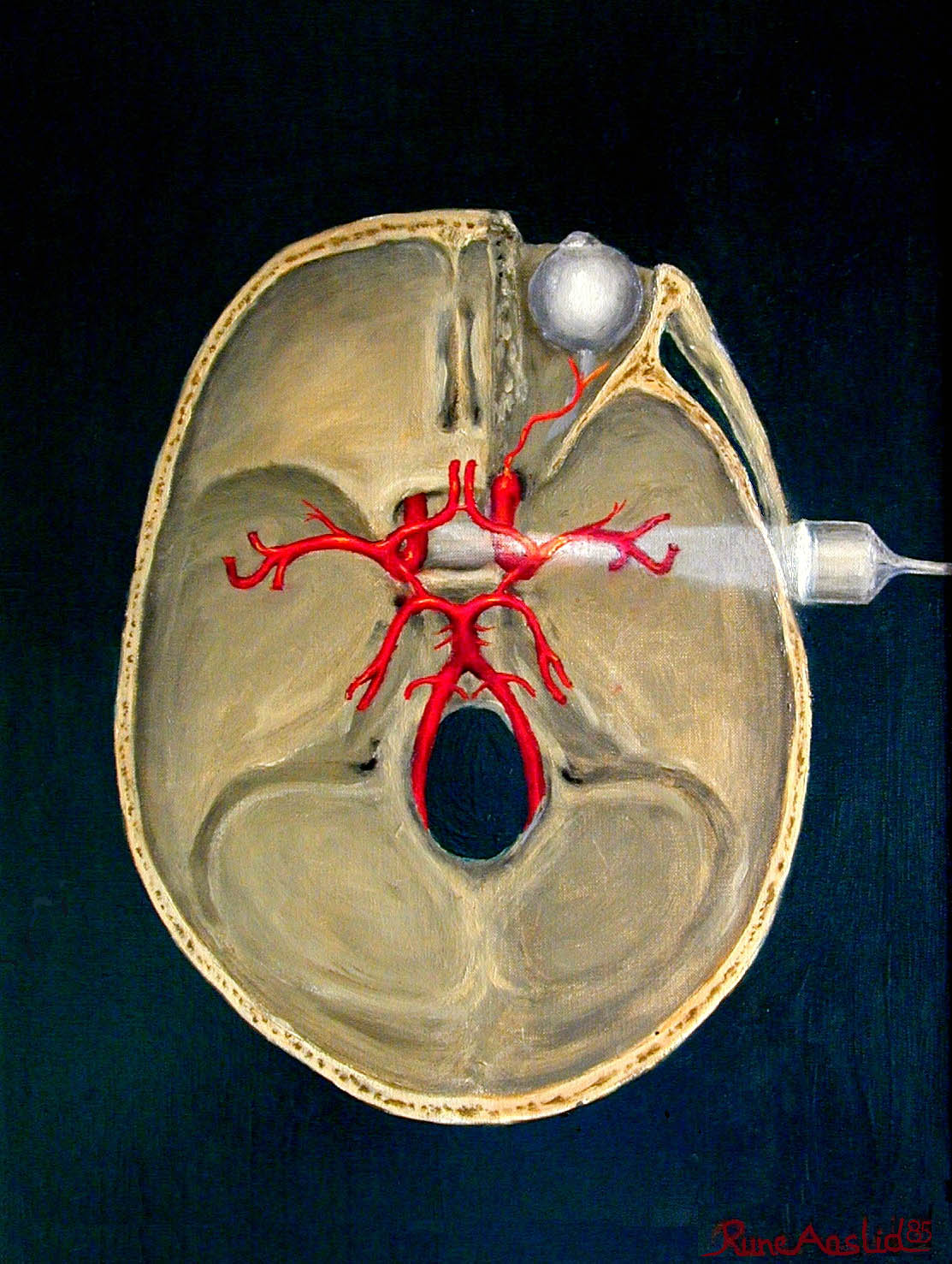
Transcranial Doppler insonation of the cerebral circulation

Transcranial Doppler (TCD) and transcranial colour Doppler (TCCD) measure the velocity of blood flow through the brain's blood vessels transcranially (through the cranium). These modes of medical imaging conduct a spectral analysis of the acoustic signals they receive and can therefore be classified as methods of active acoustocerebrography. They are used as tests to help diagnose emboli, stenosis, vasospasm from a subarachnoid hemorrhage (bleeding from a ruptured aneurysm), and other problems. These relatively quick and inexpensive tests are growing in popularity. The tests are effective for detecting sickle cell disease, ischemic cerebrovascular disease, subarachnoid hemorrhage, arteriovenous malformations, and cerebral circulatory arrest. The tests are possibly useful for perioperative monitoring and meningeal infection. The equipment used for these tests is becoming increasingly portable, making it possible for a clinician to travel to a hospital, to a doctor's office, or to a nursing home for both inpatient and outpatient studies. The tests are often used in conjunction with other tests such as MRI, MRA, carotid duplex ultrasound and CT scans. The tests are also used for research in cognitive neuroscience.

=== Blood vessels ===
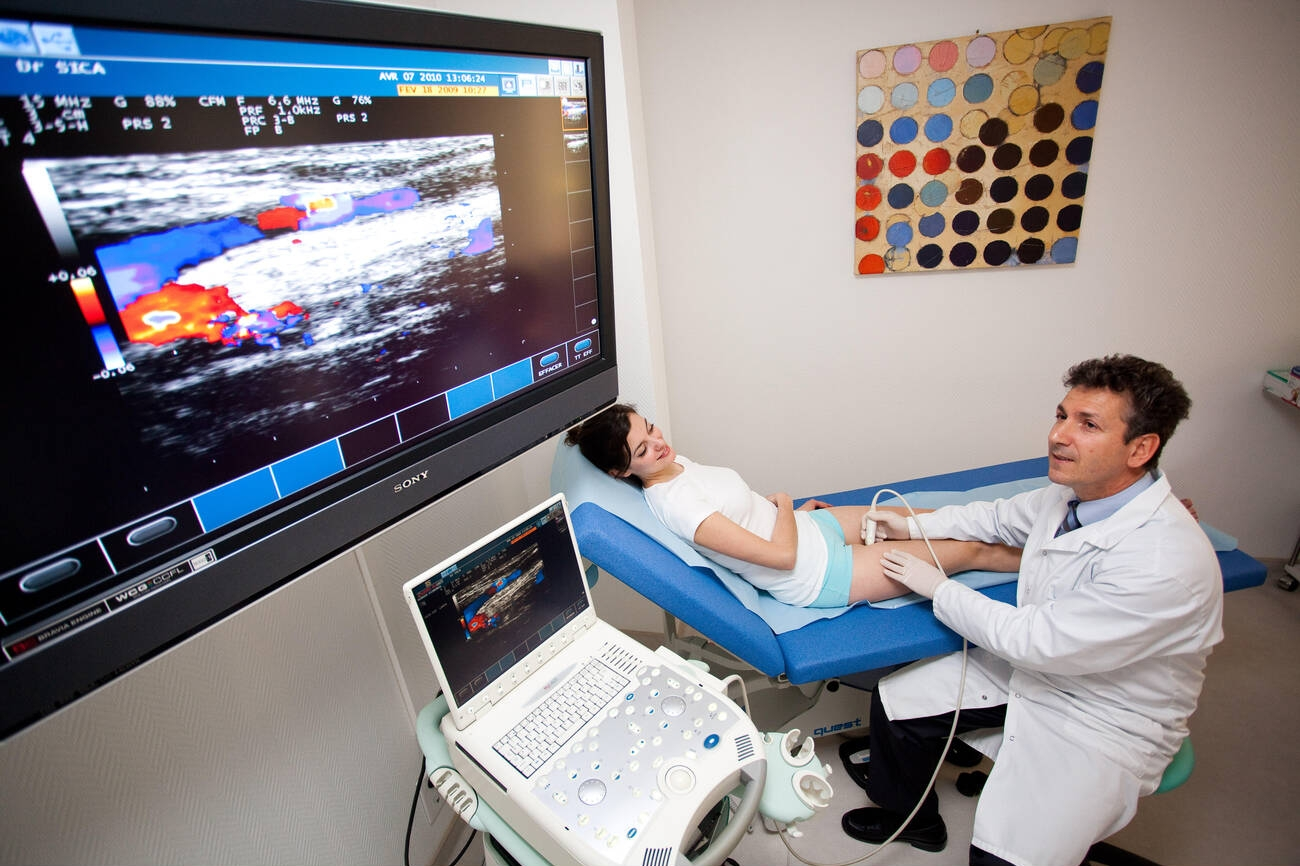
A vascular sonographer conducting a lower extremity color Doppler ultrasound examination at a medical facility in Navi Mumbai, Maharashtra.

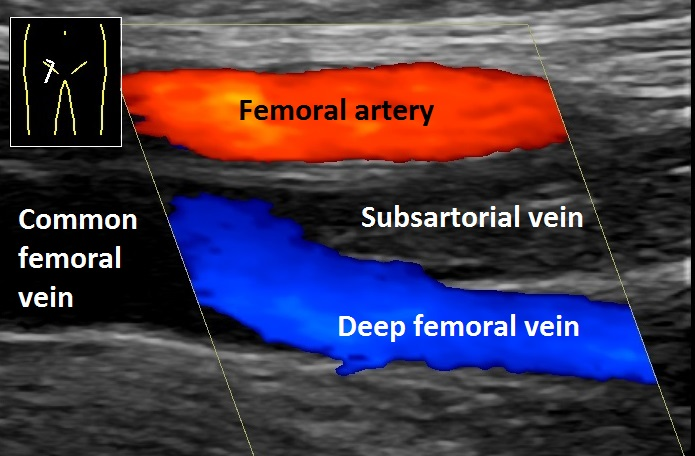
Absence of flow and hyperechogenic content in deep vein thrombosis of the subsartorial vein

Vascular ultrasonography helps determine multiple factors within the circulatory system. It can evaluate central (abdominal) and peripheral arteries and veins, it helps determine the amount of vascular stenosis (narrowing) or occlusion (complete blockage) within an artery, it assists in ruling out aneurysmal disease, and it is the main aid to rule out thrombotic events. Duplex is an inexpensive, non-invasive way to determine pathology. It is used in for example:

- Carotid ultrasonography
- Ultrasonography of deep venous thrombosis
- Ultrasonography of chronic venous insufficiency of the legs

Duplex evaluation is usually done prior to any invasive testing or surgical procedure. Ultrasound duplex scanning can provide additional information that may guide therapeutic decisions. The location and severity of arterial narrowings and occlusions can be identified. The vascular sonographer can map disease in lower-extremity segments with great accuracy, though duplex scanning is more time-consuming than other lower-extremity arterial studies.

An alternative to Doppler to visualize vessels is B-flow, which digitally highlights weak flow reflectors (mainly red blood cells) while suppressing the signals from the surrounding stationary tissue. It can visualize flowing blood and surrounding stationary tissues simultaneously. It also can monitor the pulse of blood vessels via doppler pulse detection.

In addition to visualization, ultrasound can also be used in Doppler auscultation (without visual), similar to using an ultrasound baby monitor, to locate clots or other vascular obstructions or collapse by tracing a blood vessel until sound is no longer heard. It is also used to confirm patency of dorsalis pedis arteries when edema or other conditions make manual palpation impractical.

=== Kidneys ===
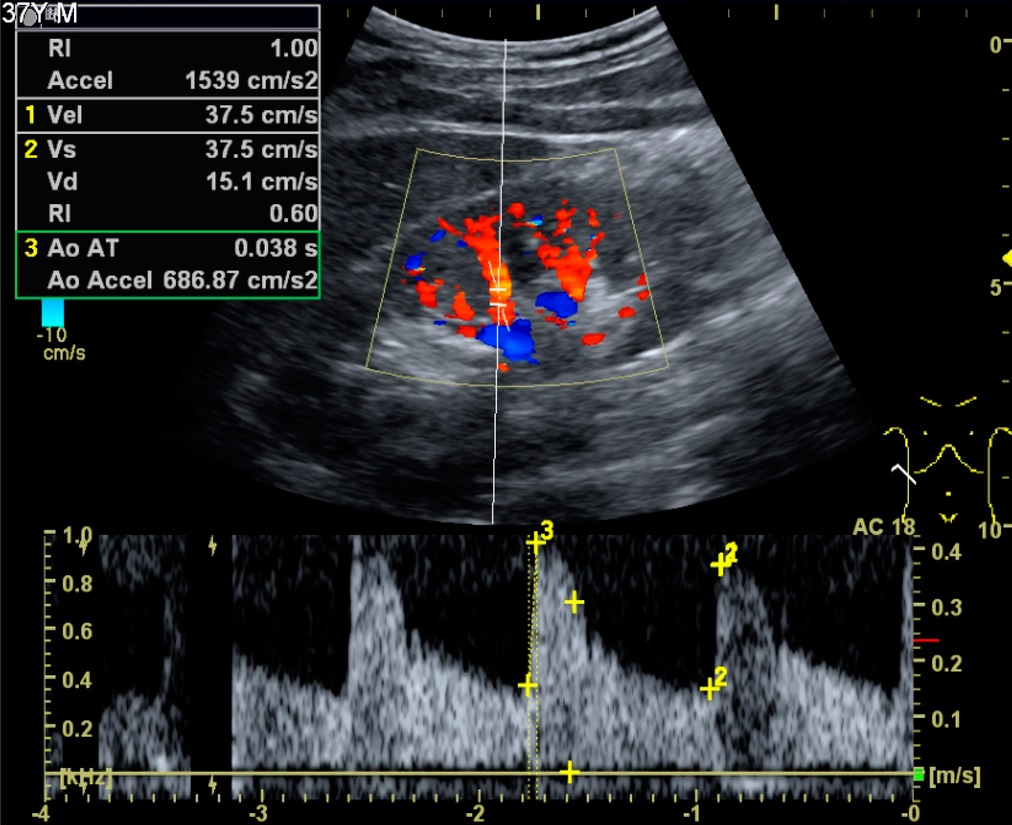
Renal ultrasonography using duplex technique of a normal adult kidney, with the estimation of the systolic velocity (Vs), the diastolic velocity (Vd), acceleration time (AoAT), systolic acceleration (Ao Accel) and resistive index (RI). Red and blue colors in the color box represent flow towards and away from the transducer, respectively. The spectrogram below the B-mode image shows flow velocity (m/s) against time (s) obtained within the range gate. The small flash icons on the spectrogram represent initiation of the flow measurement.

Doppler ultrasonography is widely used in renal ultrasonography. Renal vessels are easily depicted by the color Doppler technique in order to evaluate perfusion. Applying spectral Doppler to the renal artery and selected interlobular arteries, peak systolic velocities, resistive index, and acceleration curves can be estimated (Figure 4) (e.g., peak systolic velocity of the renal artery above 180cm/s is a predictor of renal artery stenosis of more than 60%, and a resistive index, which is a calculated from peak systolic and end systolic velocity, above 0.70 is indicative of abnormal renovascular resistance).

=== Heart ===
Doppler echocardiography is the use of Doppler ultrasonography to examine the heart. An echocardiogram can, within certain limits, produce an accurate assessment of the direction of blood flow and the velocity of blood and cardiac tissue at any arbitrary point using the Doppler effect. One of the limitations is that the ultrasound beam should be as parallel to the blood flow as possible. Velocity measurements allow assessment of cardiac valve areas and function, any abnormal communications between the left and right side of the heart, any leaking of blood through the valves (valvular regurgitation), calculation of the cardiac output and calculation of E/A ratio (a measure of diastolic dysfunction). Contrast-enhanced ultrasound using gas-filled microbubble contrast media can be used to improve velocity or other flow-related medical measurements.

=== Doppler fetal monitor ===
Doppler fetal monitors, although usually not technically -graphy but rather sound-generating, use the Doppler effect to detect the fetal heartbeat for prenatal care. These are hand-held, and some models also display the heart rate in beats per minute (BPM). Use of this monitor is sometimes known as Doppler auscultation. The Doppler fetal monitor is commonly referred to simply as a Doppler or fetal Doppler. Doppler fetal monitors provide information about the fetus similar to that provided by a fetal stethoscope.

=== Superficial soft tissues ===
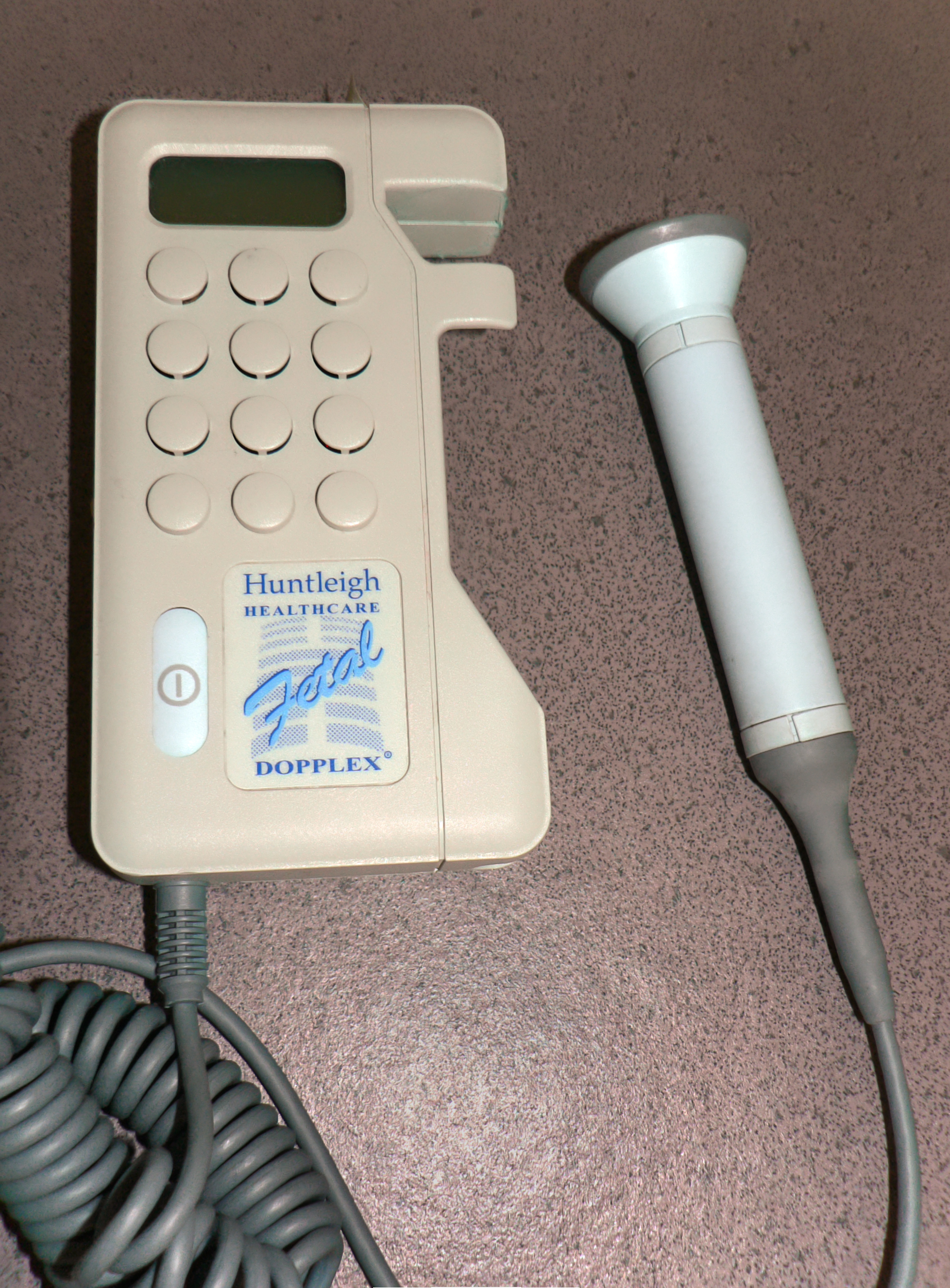
Doppler fetal monitor

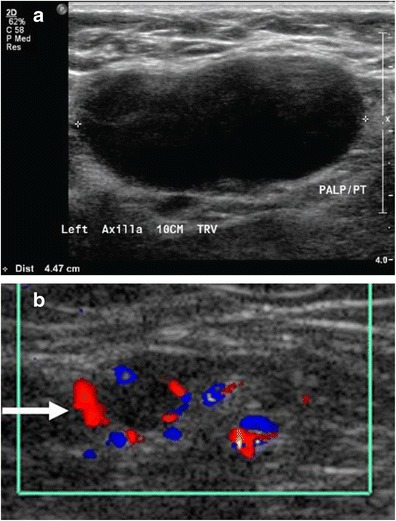
Medical ultrasonography of a soft tissue lump, showing signs of a suspected malignant lymph node:
- Doppler ultrasonography that shows hyperaemic blood flow in the hilum and central cortex and/or abnormal (non-hilar cortical) blood flow
- Increased focal cortical thickness greater than 3 mm
- Absence of the fatty hilum

Doppler ultrasonography can help distinguishing benign from malignant soft tissue lumps. Power Doppler is useful in assessing tendon and joints inflammation such as paratenonitis.
