= List of learned societies in the United States =

This is a list of learned societies in the United States.

- Academy of Criminal Justice Sciences
- Academy of Experimental Criminology
- Academy of Nutrition and Dietetics
- Acoustical Society of America
- African Studies Association
- Agriculture, Nutrition and Health Academy
- American Academy for Jewish Research
- American Academy of Actuaries
- American Academy of Arts and Letters
- American Academy of Arts and Sciences
- American Academy of Forensic Sciences
- American Academy of Religion
- American Academy of the Fine Arts
- American Accounting Association
- American Antiquarian Society
- American Arachnological Society
- American Association for the Advancement of Science
- American Association of Geographers
- American Association of Neurological Surgeons
- American Astronomical Society
- American Bar Association
- American Catholic Historical Association
- American Catholic Philosophical Association
- American Chemical Society
- American Classical League
- American College of Medical Informatics
- American College of Surgeons
- American Council for Quebec Studies
- American Council of Learned Societies
- American Dialect Society
- American Economic Association
- American Educational Research Association
- American Educational Studies Association
- American Entomological Society
- American Finance Association
- American Folklore Society
- American Geographical Society
- American Geophysical Union
- American Historical Association
- American Institute of Certified Public Accountants
- American Institute of Iranian Studies
- American Mathematical Society
- American Medical Association
- American Meteorological Society
- American Miscellaneous Society
- American Musicological Society
- American Name Society
- American Negro Academy
- American Oriental Society
- American Philosophical Association
- American Philosophical Society
- American Physical Society
- American Phytopathological Society
- American Polar Society
- American Political Science Association
- American Pomological Society
- American Psychological Association
- American Psychology–Law Society
- American Quaternary Association
- American Society for Aesthetics
- American Society for Bioethics and Humanities
- American Society for Environmental History
- American Society for Microbiology
- American Society for Neurochemistry
- American Society for Pharmacology and Experimental Therapeutics
- American Society for Photogrammetry and Remote Sensing
- American Society for Political and Legal Philosophy
- American Society for Quality
- American Society of Biomechanics
- American Society of Church History
- American Society of Criminology
- American Society of Criminology
- American Society of Mechanical Engineers
- American Society of Papyrologists
- American Society of Preventive Oncology
- American Society of Questioned Document Examiners
- American Sociological Association
- American Statistical Association
- American Venous Forum
- Archaeological Institute of America
- Association for Asian Studies
- Association for Computing Machinery
- Association for Iranian Studies
- Association for Israel Studies
- Association for Jewish Studies
- Association for Molecular Pathology
- Association for Practical and Professional Ethics
- Association for Psychological Science
- Association for Research in Otolaryngology
- Association for Research in Vision and Ophthalmology
- Association for Symbolic Logic
- Association for the Sciences of Limnology and Oceanography
- Association for the Study of Literature and Environment
- Association of Pacific Coast Geographers
- Bibliographical Society of America
- Bibliographical Society of the University of Virginia
- Biomedical Engineering Society
- Cartography and Geographic Information Society
- Casualty Actuarial Society
- Catholic Biblical Association
- Classical Association of New England
- Classical Association of the Middle West and South
- College Art Association
- College Language Association
- Columbian Institute for the Promotion of Arts and Sciences
- Comparative and International Education Society
- Congress on Research in Dance
- Connecticut Academy of Arts and Sciences
- Conservation International
- Council of Communication Associations
- Council of Editors of Learned Journals
- Council of State Neurosurgical Societies
- Dante Society of America
- Ecological Society of America
- Enoch Seminar
- Euler Society
- Geological Society of America
- Georgia Political Science Association
- Harvard Society of Fellows
- History Cambridge
- History of Economics Society
- Human Biology Association
- Illuminating Engineering Society
- Infectious Diseases Society of America
- Institute for Operations Research and the Management Sciences
- Institute for Theoretical Atomic, Molecular and Optical Physics
- Institute of Real Estate Management
- Inter-Society Color Council
- International Association for Cryptologic Research
- International Association of Lighting Designers
- International Council of Fine Arts Deans
- International Linguistic Association
- International Phycological Society
- International Psychohistorical Association
- International Society for Arabic Papyrology
- International Society of Indoor Air Quality and Climate
- International Thomas Merton Society
- Jungian Society for Scholarly Studies
- Karl Jaspers Society of North America
- Latin American Studies Association
- Lepidopterists' Society
- Lewis Carroll Society of North America
- Linguistic Society of America
- Marxist Literary Group
- Medieval Academy of America
- Mid-Atlantic Council of Latin American Studies
- Middle East Studies Association
- Middle East Studies Association of North America
- Modern Greek Studies Association
- Modern Language Association
- Mycological Society of America
- National Academy of Design
- National Academy of Education
- National Academy of Engineering
- National Academy of Medicine
- National Academy of Public Administration (United States)
- National Academy of Sciences
- National Association of School Psychologists
- National Committee for the History of Art
- National Council for Geographic Education
- National Council on Family Relations
- National Economic Association
- National Geographic Society
- Negro Society for Historical Research
- Newcomen Society of the United States
- New Jersey Academy of Science
- New York Academy of Sciences
- North American Academy of Liturgy
- North American Cartographic Information Society
- North American Society for Social Philosophy
- Northeastern Political Science Association
- Ohole Shem Association
- Oriental Club of Philadelphia
- Paleontological Society
- Peace and Justice Studies Association
- Psychonomic Society
- Radiation Research Society
- Religious Education Association
- Religious Research Association
- The Renaissance Society of America
- Rhetoric Society of America
- Society for American Music
- Society for Applied Anthropology
- Society for Classical Studies
- Society for Economic Measurement
- Society for Ethics Across the Curriculum
- Society for Freshwater Science
- Society for Historians of American Foreign Relations
- Society for Industrial and Applied Mathematics
- Society for Mathematics and Computation in Music
- Society for Medieval and Renaissance Philosophy
- Society for Music Theory
- Society for Personality and Social Psychology
- Society for Political Methodology
- Society for Risk Analysis
- Society for Social Studies of Science
- Society for the Advancement of Scandinavian Study
- Society for the Study of Human Development
- Society for the Study of Social Problems
- The Society for the Study of the Multi-Ethnic Literature of the United States
- Society for Utopian Studies
- Society of Actuaries
- Society of American Archivists
- Society of American Foresters
- Society of Architectural Historians
- Society of Behavioral Medicine
- Society of Biblical Literature
- Society of Christian Ethics
- Society of Experimental Social Psychology
- Society of Exploration Geophysicists
- Society of General Internal Medicine
- The Society of Hellman Fellows
- Society of Jewish Ethics
- Society of Thoracic Surgeons
- Society of Woman Geographers
- Southern Political Science Association
- Southern Society for Philosophy and Psychology
- Textile Society of America
- Weed Science Society of America
- Western Psychological Association
- Western Society of Criminology
- Women in German
- Working-Class Studies Association

== See also ==
- List of historical societies in the United States
