= List of psychology organizations =

This is a list of organizations and societies in psychology.

== A ==
- Academy for Eating Disorders
- Academy of Counseling Psychology
- Aelation Lifelong Learning Research Council
- American Academy of Child and Adolescent Psychiatry
- American Academy of Clinical Neuropsychology
- American Academy of Psychiatry and the Law
- American Academy of Psychoanalysis and Dynamic Psychiatry
- American Association of Community Psychiatrists
- American Association of Geriatric Psychiatry
- American Group Psychotherapy Association
- American Psychiatric Association
- American Psychiatric Nurses Association
- American Psychoanalytic Association
- American Psychological Association
- Archives of the History of American Psychology
- ASC Healthcare
- Association for Advancement of Behavior Therapy
- Association for Behavior Analysis International
- Association for Child and Adolescent Mental Health
- Association for College Psychiatry
- Association for Contextual Behavioral Science
- Association for the Scientific Study of Consciousness
- Association for Psychological Science
- Association for Rational Emotive Behaviour Therapy
- Association for Transpersonal Psychology
- Association of Black Psychologists
- Anxiety and Depression Association of America
- Australian Psychological Society
- Australian Association of Psychologists Inc
- Australian Psychology Accreditation Council

== B ==
- Beat (formerly Eating Disorders Association)
- The Behavior Analyst Certification Board
- Behavior Genetics Association
- Belgian Psychological Association
- B. F. Skinner Foundation
- British Association for Behavioural and Cognitive Psychotherapies
- British Psychoanalytical Society
- British Psychological Society
- Buenos Aires Psychoanalytic Association

== C ==
- Canadian Psychological Association
- Cambridge Center for Behavioral Studies

== E ==
- Environmental Design Research Association
- European Academy of Occupational Health Psychology
- European Association of Counselling Psychology
- European Federation of Psychologists' Associations (EFPA)
- European Federation of Psychology Students' Associations (EFPSA)
- European Federation of Psychology Teachers' Associations
- European Health Psychology Society
- Experimental Psychology Society

== F ==
- FABBS Foundation
- Federation of Associations in Behavioral & Brain Sciences
- Finnish Psychological Society

== G ==
- German Psychological Association
- Goy Psychological Center

== H ==
- Human Factors and Ergonomics Society
- Houston Psychological Association
- Hong Kong Association of Doctors in Clinical Psychology (HKADCP)
- Hong Kong Psychological Society

== I ==
- Institute of Professional Psychologists
- International Association for Analytical Psychology
- International Association for Cross-Cultural Psychology
- International Association for Jungian Studies
- International Association of Applied Psychology
- International Council of Psychologists
- International Early Psychosis Association
- International Literature and Psychology Conference
- International Psychoanalytic Association
- International School Psychology Association
- International Society for Comparative Psychology
- International Society for the Study of Behavioural Development
- International Society for the Study of Individual Differences
- International Society for Intelligence Research
- International Society for Research on Aggression
- International Society of Political Psychology
- International Society of the Rorschach and Projective Methods
- International Society on Infant Studies
- International Transpersonal Association
- International Union of Psychological Science
- International Institute for the Advanced Studies of Psychotherapy and Applied Mental Health

== J ==
- Jungian Society for Scholarly Studies

== L ==
- LivingWorks, a suicide prevention organization

== M ==
- Massachusetts General Hospital Psychiatry Academy
- Minnesota Association For Children's Mental Health

== N ==
- National Association of School Psychologists
- Nigerian Association of Clinical Psychologists
- Nigerian Psychological Association
- North American Society of Adlerian Psychology

== O ==
- OPIFER, Organizzazione di Psicoanalisti Italiani Federazione e Registro
- OUPS, Open University Psychological Society

== P ==
- Plega: Sport Psychology
- Psi Chi, National Honor Society in Psychology
- Psychological Association of the Philippines (PAP)
- Psychonomic Society
- Psychological Society of Ireland
- Psychologist's Federation of Venezuela

== R ==
- Romanian Association for Cognitive and Behavioral Psychotherapies

== S ==
- Singapore Psychological Society
- Society for the Advancement of Psychotherapy (Division 29 of the American Psychological Association)
- Society for Industrial and Organizational Psychology (SIOP)
- Society for Industrial and Organisational Psychology Australia
- Society for Occupational Health Psychology
- Society for Personality Assessment
- Society for Research in Child Development
- Society for Research on Adolescence
- Society of Analytical Psychology
- Society of Clinical Child & Adolescent Psychology
- Swedish Psychological Society
- Society for Media Psychology and Technology

== W ==
- World Federation for Mental Health

== See also ==
- List of schools of psychoanalysis
