= Petra M. Sijpesteijn =

Dutch professor of Arabic language and culture (born 1971)

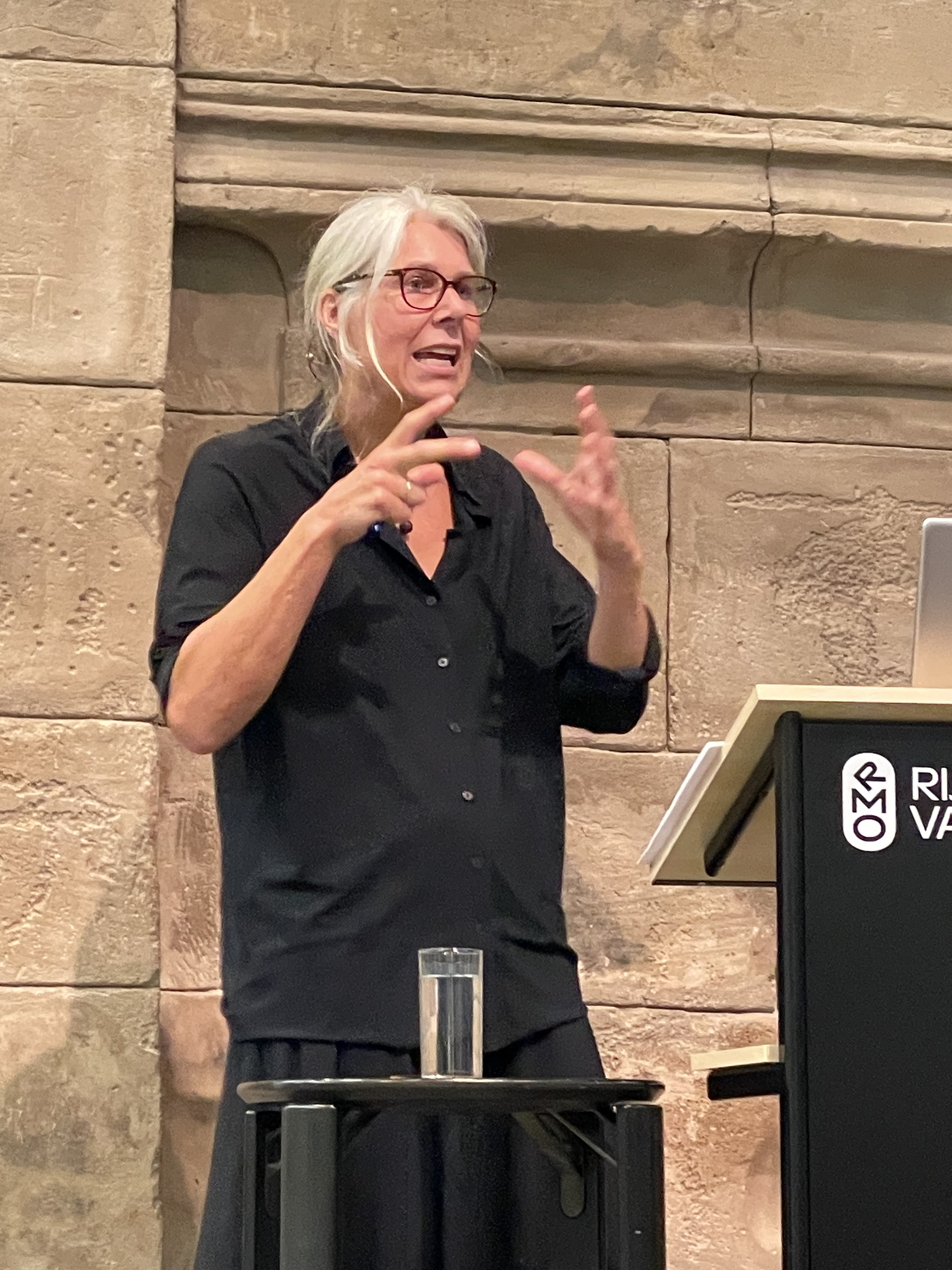
Sijpesteijn (2025)

Petra Marieke Sijpesteijn (born 2 February 1971, Naarden) is Professor of Arabic at Leiden University. She was the founding president of the International Society for Arabic Papyrology.

== Early life ==
Sijpesteijn studied history and Arabic at Leiden University and gained her MA. She graduated in History in 1996 with the thesis Crisis, Continuity or a Turning Point? Syrian Cities in the Byzantine and Islamic Empires. In 1997, she obtained her doctorate in Arabic studies with Scribbles from the Past. A Catalog of Arabic Letters Written on Papyrus. After studying for a year at Cornell University and researching at Oxford University. Her PhD won the annual departmental prize for best thesis in 2004.

== Career ==
Sijpesteijn was the founding president of the International Society for Arabic Papyrology (2001–2014). She is currently the chair of Arabic at Leiden University.

Since 2008, Sijpesteijn has been Professor of Arabic language and culture at Leiden University. She is director of the Leiden University Center for the Study of Islam (LUCIS). Her work focuses on the history of Islam in the sixth and seventh centuries. Sijpesteijn works with Arabic, Greek and Coptic papyri from the Islamic period as historical sources, but mainly publishes Arabic papyri. Her research focuses on the relationship between Islam and political power in the Middle East. By deciphering Arabic papyri, she wants to contribute to adjusting the static image of Islam used in contemporary discussions.

In mid-2026, she had an h-index of 30.

== Awards and achievements ==
Sijpesteijn has been awarded various research grants, including 3 million euros from the European Research Council. In June 2022, she was elected foreign member of the Académie des inscriptions et belles-lettres. In April 2024, she was appointed foreign member of the Austrian Academy of Sciences. She was elected an International Fellow of the British Academy in 2024. She is a board member of the Association International de Papyrology, the G.H.A. Juynboll Foundation, the Oriental Institute and the editorial board of the Journal of Ancient History. In February 2025, she was elected member of the Koninklijke Hollandsche Maatschappij der Wetenschappen (Royal Holland Society of Sciences and Humanities).

== Selected publications ==
- Sijpesteijn P.M. (2015), 'A Ḥadīth Fragment on Papyrus', Der Islam: Journal of the History and Culture of the Middle East, 92(2): 321-331.
- Sijpesteijn P.M, Montgomery J.E. & Gelder G.J. van (2015), Wit and Wisdom in Classical Arabic Literature. Leiden Lectures on Arabic Language and Culture. Leiden: Leiden University Press.
- Sijpesteijn P.M. (2014), 'Financial Troubles. A Mamluk Petition'. In: Franklin A., Margariti R., Rustow M., Simonsohn U. (Eds.) Jews, Christians and Muslims in Medieval and Early Modern Times. A Festschrift in Honor of Mark R. Cohen. Christians and Jews in Muslim Societies, no. 2. Leiden: E.J. Brill. 352-366.
- Sijpesteijn P.M. (2014), 'Financial Troubles. A Mamluk Petition'. In: Franklin A.E., Margariti R.E., Rustow M., Simonsohn U. (Eds.) Jews, Christians and Muslims in Medieval and Early Modern Times. A Festschrift in Honor of Mark R. Cohen. Christians and Jews in Muslim Societies, no. 2. Leiden: Brill. 352-366.
- Sijpesteijn P.M. (2014), 'Making the Private Public. A Delivery of Palestinian Oil in Third/Ninth-Century Egypt', Studia Orientalia Electronica 2: 74-91.
- Sijpesteijn P.M. (2014), An Early Umayyad Papyrus Invitation for the Ḥajj, Journal of Near Eastern Studies 73: 179-190.
- Sijpesteijn P.M. (2014), Locating Arabic Papyrology: Fiscal politics in medieval Egypt as a test-case for setting disciplinary boundaries and standards, The Bulletin of the American Society of Papyrologists 51: 217-228.
- Sijpesteijn P.M. (2013), Shaping a Muslim State: The World of a Mid-Eighth-Century Egyptian Official. Oxford: Oxford University Press.
- Sijpesteijn P.M. (2012), Coptic and Arabic Papyri from Deir al-Balā’izah. In: Schubert P. (Ed.) Actes du 26e Congrès international de papyrologie (Genève 2010). Geneva: Droz. 707-714.
- Sijpesteijn P.M. (2012), Seals and Papyri from Early Islamic Egypt. In: Regulski I, Duistermaat K, Verkinderen P (Eds.) Seals and Sealing Practices in the Near East. Developments in Administration and Magic from Prehistory to the Islamic Period. Louvain: Peeters. 171-182.
- Sijpesteijn P.M. (2012), An Arabic Land Lease from Ṭuṭūn. In: Ast R., Cuvigny H., Hickey, T. (Eds.) Papyrological Texts in Honor of Roger S. Bagnall no. 53. Durham NC: American Society of Papyrologists. 101-106.
- Sijpesteijn P.M. (2012), Nessana. In: Wiley-Blackwell's Encyclopedia of Ancient History. Oxford.
- Sijpesteijn P.M. (2012), Why Arabic?. Leiden: Leiden University Press.
- Sijpesteijn P.M. (2012), Taking Care of the Weak An Arabic Papyrus from the Tropenmuseum, Amsterdam. In: Minutoli D. (Ed.) Inediti offerti a Rosario Pintaudi per il 65° compleanno (P.Pintaudi). Florence: Edizioni Gonnelli. 289-294.
- Sijpesteijn P.M. (2011), Building an Egyptian Identity. In: Ahmed A Q., Bonner M., Sadeghi B. (Eds.) The Islamic Scholarly Tradition: Studies in History, Law, and Thought in Honor of Professor Michael Allen Cook. Leiden: E.J. Brill. 85-106.
- Sijpesteijn P.M. (2011), Une nouvelle lettre de Qurra b. Šarīk. P.Sorb. inv. 2345, Annales Islamologiques 45: 257-267.
- Sijpesteijn P.M., Margariti R. & Sabra A. (Eds.) (2011), Studies in the Social and Economic History of the Medieval Middle East. Essays in Honor of A.L. Udovitch. Leiden: Brill.
- Sijpesteijn P.M. (2011), Army Economics: An Early Papyrus Letter Related to ‘Aṭā’ Payments. In: Margarati R., Sabra A., Sijpesteijn P.M. (Eds.) Histories of the Middle East Studies in Middle Eastern Society, Economy and Law in Honor of A.L. Udovitch. Leiden: E. J. Brill. 245-268.
- Sijpesteijn P.M. (2010), Muhammad. In: Wiley-Blackwell's Encyclopedia of Ancient History. Oxford.
- Sijpesteijn P.M. (2010), Barabra. In: Encyclopaedia of Islam 3. Leiden: E.J. Brill.
- Sijpesteijn P.M. (2010), Hijra. In: Wiley-Blackwell's Encyclopedia of Ancient History. Oxford.
- Sijpesteijn P.M. (2010), Arabic-Greek Archives. In: Papaconstantinou A. (Ed.) The Multilingual Experience in Egypt, from the Ptolemies to the 'Abbasids. Burlington: Ashgate. 105-126.
- Sijpesteijn P.M. (2010), Quran. In: Wiley-Blackwell's Encyclopedia of Ancient History. Oxford.
- Sijpesteijn P.M. (2010), Baqt. In: Encyclopaedia of Islam 3. Leiden: E.J. Brill.
- Sijpesteijn P.M. (2010), North American Papyrus Collections Revisited, Al-Bardiyyat 1: 5-18.
- Sijpesteijn P.M. (2010), Akhmim. In: Encyclopaedia of Islam 3. Leiden: E.J. Brill. 56-58.
- Sijpesteijn P.M. (2009), Landholding Patterns in Early Islamic Egypt, Journal of Agrarian Change (9): 120-133.
- Sijpesteijn P.M. (2009), A Mid-Eighth-Century Trilingual Tax Demand to a Bawit Monk. In: Boud'hors A., Clackson J., Louis C, Sijpesteijn P.M. (Eds.) The Administration of Monastic Estates in Late Antique and Early Islamic Egypt. Oxford. 102-119.
- Sijpesteijn P.M. (2009), Arabic Papyri and Islamic Egypt. In: Bagnall R.S. (Ed.) Oxford Handbook of Papyrology. Oxford: Oxford University Press. 452-472.
- Sijpesteijn P.M., Boud’hors A., Clackson J. & Louis C. (Eds.) (2009), Monastic Estates in Late Antique and Early Islamic Egypt: Ostraca, Papyri, and Studies in Honour of Sarah Clackson. Durham, NC: The American Society of Papyrologists.
- Sijpesteijn P.M. (2008), A Seventh/Eighth-Century List of Companions from Fustat. In: Muhs B., Hogendijk C. (Eds.) Sixty-Five Papyrological Texts Presented to Klaas A. Worp on the Occasion of his 65th Birthday. Leiden: E.J. Brill. 369-377.
- Sijpesteijn P.M. (2007), The Arab Conquest of Egypt and the Beginning of Muslim Rule. In: Bagnall R.S. (Ed.) Byzantine Egypt. Cambridge: Cambridge University Press. 437-459.
- Sijpesteijn P.M. (2007), Arabic Papyri from Current Excavations in Egypt, Al-Bardiyyat(2): 10-23.
- Sijpesteijn P.M. (2007), Palaeography. In: Versteegh C. (Ed.) Encyclopedia of Arabic Language
- Sijpesteijn P.M. (2007), Creating a Muslim State: The Collection and Meaning of Sadaqa. In: Palme B. (Ed.) Akten des 23. internationalen Papyrologenkongresses Wien, 22.-28. Juli 2001. Vienna. 661-674.
- Sijpesteijn P.M. (2007), New Rule over Old Structures: Egypt after the Muslim Conquest. In: Crawford H. (Ed.) Regime Change in the Ancient Near East and Egypt: From Sargon of Agade to the Seljuks. Proceedings of the British Academy. London: British Academy Publications. 183-202.
- Sijpesteijn P.M. (2006), Veroveren met verhalen. In: Hoftijzer P., Van Ommen K., Witkam J.J. (Eds.) Bronnen en Kennis. Leiden: Scaliger Institute Publications. 17-22.
- Sijpesteijn P.M. (2006), The Archival Mind in Early Islamic Egypt: Two Arabic Papyri. In: *Sijpesteijn P.M., Sundelin L., Torallas Tovar S., Zomeno A. (Eds.) From al-Andalus to Khurasan: Documents from the Medieval Muslim World. Leiden: E.J. Brill. 163-187.
- Sijpesteijn P.M., Sundelin L., Torallas Tovar S. & Zomeno A. (Eds.) (2006), From al-Andalus to Khurasan: Documents from the Medieval Muslim World. Leiden: E.J. Brill.
- Sijpesteijn P.M., Oates J.F. & Kaplony A. (2005), Checklist of Editions of Arabic Papyri, The Bulletin of the American Society of Papyrologists 42: 127-166.
- Sijpesteijn P.M. & Sundelin L. (Eds.) (2004), Papyrology and the History of Early Islamic Egypt. Leiden: E. J. Brill.
- Sijpesteijn P.M. (2004), A Request to Buy Silk from Early Islamic Egypt. In: Harrauer H., Pintaudi R. (Eds.) Gedenkschrift Ulrike Horak. Papyrologica Florentina XXXIV. Florence: Edizioni Gonelli. 255-272.
- Sijpesteijn P.M. (2004), Travel and Trade on the River. In: Sijpesteijn P.M., Sundelin L. (Eds.) Papyrology and the History of Early Islamic Egypt.. Leiden: E.J. Brill. 115-152.
- Sijpesteijn P.M. (2001), Profit Following Responsibility: A Leaf from the Records of a Third-Century Tax-Collecting Agent. With an Appended Checklist of Editions of Arabic Papyri, Journal of Juristic Papyrology 31: 91-132.
