= Women in Germany =

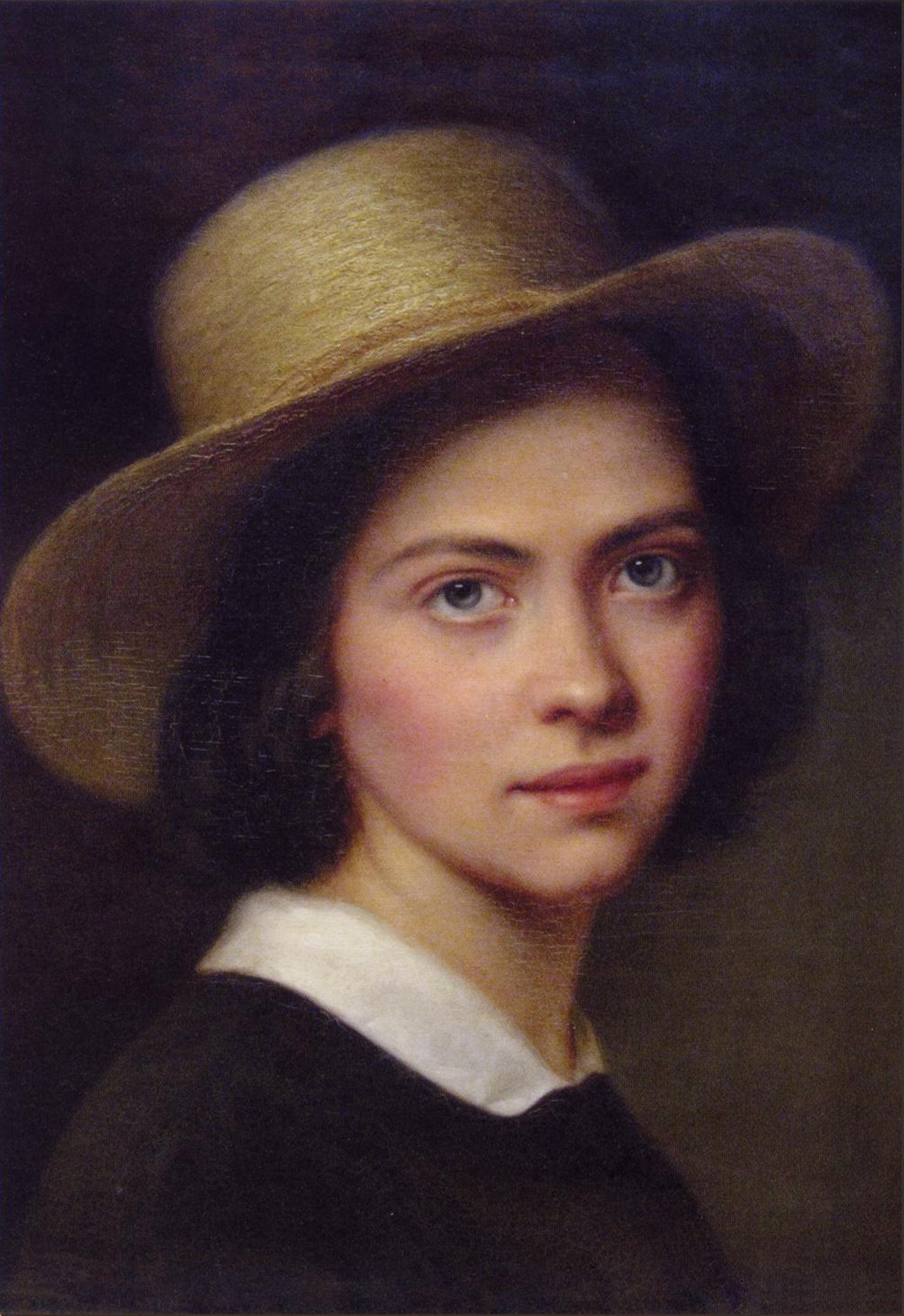
- Julie Wilhelmine Hagen-Schwarz's; Self portrait (before 1870)

General statistics
- Maternal mortality (per 100,000): 4.1
- Women in parliament: 36.9%
- Women over 25 with secondary education: 96.4% [M: 97.0%]
- Women in labour force: 73% [M: 83%]

Gender Inequality Index
- Value: 0.073 (2021)
- Rank: 19th out of 191

Global Gender Gap Index
- Value: 0.801 (2022)
- Rank: 10th out of 146

The roles of German women have changed throughout history, as the culture and society in which they lived had undergone various transformations. In the past and in the present the situation of women has differed between German regions, notably during the 20th century, when West Germany and East Germany had different political and socioeconomic organization. In addition, Southern Germany has a history of strong Roman Catholic influence.

== Historical context ==
The traditional role of women in German society was often described by the so-called "four Ks" in the German language: Kinder (children), Kirche (church), Küche (kitchen), and Kleider (clothes), indicating that their main duties were bearing and rearing children, attending to religious activities, cooking and serving food, and dealing with clothes and fashion. However, their roles changed during the 20th century. After obtaining the right to vote in 1918, German women began to take on active roles previously performed by men. After the end of World War II, they were labeled as the Trümmerfrauen or "women of the rubble" because they took care of the "wounded, buried the dead, salvaged belongings", and participated in the "hard task of rebuilding war-torn Germany by simply clearing away" the rubble and ruins of war.

Although conservative in many ways, Germany differs from other German-speaking regions in Europe, being much more progressive on women's right to be politically involved than neighbouring Switzerland, where women only obtained the right to vote in 1971 at federal level, and at local canton level in 1990 in the canton of Appenzell Innerrhoden) and Liechtenstein in 1984. In Germany, there are also strong regional differences; for instance Southern Germany (particularly Bavaria) is more conservative than other parts of Germany; while former East Germany is more supporting of women's professional life than former West Germany.

== Marriage and family law ==
Family law in West Germany had, until relatively recently, assigned women a role subordinate to that of their husbands. It was only in 1977 that legislative changes provided for gender equality in marriage; until that date, married women in West Germany could not work without permission from their husbands. In East Germany, however, women had more rights.

In 1977, the divorce law in West Germany underwent major changes, moving from a fault-based divorce system to one that is primarily no-fault. These newer divorce regulations, in force throughout Germany, stipulate that a no-fault divorce can be obtained on the grounds of one year of de facto separation if both spouses consent, and three years of de facto separation if only one spouse consents. There is also provision for a "speedy divorce" which can be obtained on demand by either spouse, without the necessary separation period, if it is proved in court that the continuation of the marriage would constitute an unreasonable hardship for the petitioner for reasons related to the behavior of the other spouse; this exemption requires exceptional circumstances and is considered on a case-by-case basis.

In recent years, in Germany, as in other Western countries, there has been a rapid increase in unmarried cohabitation and births outside marriage; in 2014, 35% of births in Germany were to unmarried women. There are, however, marked differences between the regions of the former West Germany and East Germany: significantly more children are born out of wedlock in eastern Germany than in western Germany: in 2012, in eastern Germany 61.6% of births were to unmarried women, but in western Germany only 28.4%.

The views on sexual self-determination, as it relates to marriage, have also changed: for instance, until 1969, adultery was a criminal offense in West Germany. It was only in 1997 that Germany removed its marital exemption from its rape law, being one of the last Western countries to do so, after a lengthy political battle that started in the 1970s. Specifically, before 1997, the definition of rape in Germany was: "Whoever compels a woman to have extramarital intercourse with him, or with a third person, by force or the threat of present danger to life or limb, shall be punished by not less than two years' imprisonment". In 1997 there were changes to the rape law, broadening the definition, making it gender-neutral, and removing the marital exemption. Before, marital rape could only be prosecuted as "Causing bodily harm" (Section 223 of the German Criminal Code), "Insult" (Section 185 of the German Criminal Code) and "Using threats or force to cause a person to do, suffer or omit an act" (Nötigung, Section 240 of the German Criminal Code) which carried lower sentences, and were rarely prosecuted.

== Professional life ==
Gender pay gap in average gross hourly earnings in the EU member states, according to Eurostat 2014. Germany has one of the largest gender pay gaps in the EU.

While women in East Germany were encouraged to participate in the workforce, this was not the case in West Germany in the 1950s, when a woman's primary role was understood to be at home, taking care of her family. This division can be traced back to the postwar reconstruction era when West Germany emphasized traditional family structures as a cornerstone of societal recovery. Postwar policies, such as financial incentives for large families and legislation limiting married women's access to full-time jobs, were designed to reinforce the role of women as mothers and home-makers. These measures not only aimed to rebuild national stability but also served as a cultural counterpoint to East Germany's socialist promotion of gender equality in labor. However many women, particularly war widows and displaced individuals, entered the workforce out of economic necessity, driven by introduction of the new currency Deutsche Mark, the collapse of the black market, and the shift from a subsistence economy to wage labor. The tension between societal expectations and economic realities continues to shape gender dynamics in modern Germany.

In recent years, more women are working for pay. Although most women are employed, many work part-time; in the European Union, only the Netherlands and Austria have more women working part-time. One problem that women have to face is that mothers who have young children and want to pursue a career may face social criticism. In 2014, the governing coalition agreed to impose a 30% female quota for supervisory board positions from 2016 onwards.

Compared to other Western and even non-Western countries, Germany has a low proportion of women in business leadership roles, lower even than Turkey, Malaysia, Nigeria, Indonesia, Botswana, and India. One of the reasons for the low presence of women in key positions is the social norm that considers full-time work inappropriate for women. Southern Germany, especially, is conservative regarding gender roles. In 2011, José Manuel Barroso, then president of the European Commission, stated "Germany, but also Austria and the Netherlands, should look at the example of the northern countries [...] that means removing obstacles for women, older workers, foreigners and low-skilled job-seekers to get into the workforce".

== Violence against women ==
A 2013 UN study of 202 world jurisdictions found that in Germany 47.3% of homicide victims are female, the 10th highest percentage of female victims of all jurisdictions, and considerably above the world average of 21.3%. The percentage of female victims was also high in neighboring Switzerland (50%) and Austria (40.2%) (see Homicide statistics by gender).

According to a 2023 survey by children's charity Plan International Germany, a third of young men (aged 18–35) in Germany found violence against women to be acceptable.

== Reproductive health and fertility ==
The maternal mortality rate in Germany was 7 deaths per 100,000 live births in 2010. The HIV/AIDS rate was estimated in 2009 as 0.1% of people aged 15 to 49. The total fertility rate (TFR) in Germany in 2016 was 1.44 births per woman, one of the lowest in the world. Childlessness is quite high: of women born in 1968 in West Germany, 25% remained childless.

Abortion in Germany is legal during the first trimester on condition of mandatory counseling, and later in pregnancy in cases of medical necessity. In both cases there is a waiting period of 3 days.

Sex education in schools is mandated by law. The German Constitutional Court, and in 2011 the European Court of Human Rights, rejected complaints from several Baptist Christian parents against Germany's mandatory school sex education.

== See also ==
- Alice Schwarzer
- Angela Merkel
- Feminism in Germany
- Gender roles in post-communist Central and Eastern Europe
- List of German queens
- List of German women artists
- List of German women photographers
- List of German women writers
- List of German women's football champions
- List of Germany women's international footballers
- Open Christmas Letter (To the Women of Germany and Austria)
- Women in German
- Women in German history series
- Women in German Studies
- Women in Nazi Germany
- Women in Europe
