= William Dunham (mathematician) =

American mathematician and historian of mathematics (b. 1947)

William Wade Dunham (born 1947) is an American writer who was originally trained in topology but became interested in the history of mathematics and specializes in Leonhard Euler. He has received several awards for writing and teaching on this subject.

== Education ==
Dunham received his bachelor's degree from the University of Pittsburgh in 1969, his master's degree from Ohio State University in 1970, and his PhD from the same institution in 1974.

== Writings ==
Dunham won the American Association of Publishers' award for writing the Best Mathematics Book of 1994 for his book The Mathematical Universe. In his book Euler: The Master of Us All, he examines Leonhard Euler's impressive mathematical work. He received a Lester R. Ford Award in 2006 for his expository article Touring the Calculus, and the Chauvenet Prize in 2022 for his article on the Möbius function.

In 2007, Dunham gave a lecture about Euler's product-sum formula and its relationship to analytic number theory, as well as discussed Euler's evaluation of a non-trivial integral at the celebration of "Year of Euler" by the Euler Society. He published a chapter "Euler and the Fundamental Theorem of Algebra" in the book The Genius of Euler published in 2007 to commemorate the 300th birthday of Euler.

== Works ==
- Dunham, William (1990). Journey Through Genius: The Great Theorems of Mathematics (1st ed.). John Wiley and Sons. ISBN 0-471-50030-5.
- Dunham, William (1994). The Mathematical Universe (1st ed.). John Wiley and Sons. ISBN 0-471-53656-3.
- Dunham, William (1999). Euler: The Master of Us All (1st ed.). Mathematical Association of America. ISBN 0-88385-328-0.
- Dunham, William (2007). "Euler and the Fundamental Theorem of Algebra" in The Genius of Euler: Reflections on his Life and Work. Mathematical Association of America. ISBN 978-0-88385-558-4.
- Dunham, William (2008). The Calculus Gallery (1st ed.). Princeton University Press. ISBN 978-0-691-13626-4.
- Dunham, William (2010). Great Thinkers, Great Theorems (Video Lecture Series). The Teaching Company. ISBN 159803690-4.
