= Tal Ilan =

Israeli historian and lexicographer

- טל אילן
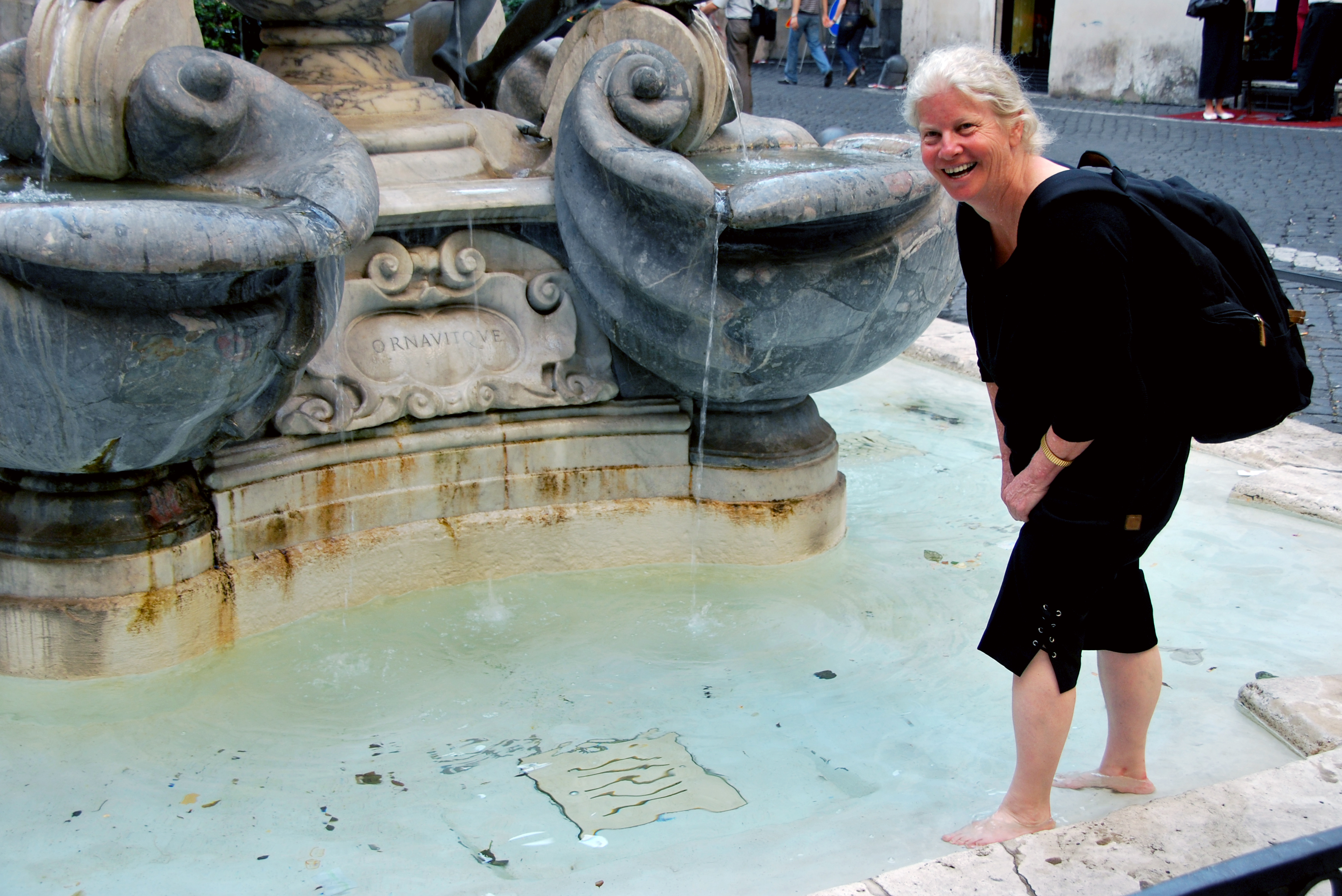
- Born: January 24, 1956 (age 70); Kibbutz Lahav, Israel
- Occupations: Historian, Lexicographer

Academic background
- Education: Hebrew University of Jerusalem

Academic work
- Institutions: Free University of Berlin
- Notable works: The Feminist Commentary on the Babylonian Talmud (FCBT), Lexicon of Jewish Names in Late Antiquity

Tal Ilan (Hebrew: טל אילן; born 1956) is an Israeli historian, notably of women's history in Judaism, and lexicographer. She is known for her work in rabbinic literature, the history of ancient Judaism, the Dead Sea Scrolls, ancient Jewish historiography, Jewish epigraphy, archaeology and papyrology, onomastics, and ancient Jewish magic. She is the initiator and director of The Feminist Commentary on the Babylonian Talmud (FCBT). She received her education from the Hebrew University of Jerusalem. Ilan, now retired, was a professor for Jewish Studies with focus on late antiquity at the Free University of Berlin (German: Freie Universität Berlin).

== Early life and education ==
Tal Ilan was born on January 24, 1956, on Kibbutz Lahav in the Negev desert. She did her PhD at the Hebrew University of Jerusalem. Her thesis was Jewish Women in Palestine during the Hellenistic Roman Period (332 BCE-200CE).

== Career ==
Following her thesis, Ilan taught in the Department of the History of the Jewish People at the University of Jerusalem. She became a professor of Jewish studies at the Freie University in Berlin in 2003. She has lectured and had fellowships at the University of Frankfurt, the University of Oldenburg, Harvard, Yale, the Jewish Theological Seminary, the Schechter Institute, Ben Gurion University, Trinity College, Oxford, and Leo Baeck College.

Tal Ilan examines gender issues in the Bible, Hellenistic literature, and Rabbinic literature in four of her works: her PhD project, Women in the Second Temple Literature, Mine and Yours And Hers, and Integrating Women. She uses feminist theory to interpret these texts, and pays attention to language, text, and textual tradition to inform her work. These ideas have been furthered in Feminist Commentary on the Babylonian Talmud.

Ilan's work, Lexicon of Jewish Names in Late Antiquity contains 4 volumes. It presents an exhaustive list of the recorded names associated with Jews in late antiquity, and explores their etymology, distribution, and potential to inform scholars about Jewish life during this time.

Ilan's work, A Collection of Texts on Jews and Judaism on Perishable Material from Egypt: 330 BCE-700 CE, written in collaboration with Noah Hacham, corrects, updates, and publishes evidence of Jews in Egypt from the Hellenistic period to the Arab conquest. The materials Ilan has been working with in this project have been papyrus, ostraca, and parchment.

Ilan's work " A Digital Synopsis of the Mishnah and Tosefta", in collaboration with Hayim Lapin, is a digital research tool that uses computerized and manual text analysis to evaluate the relationship between the Mishnah and the Tosefta. This project is funded by the NEH/DFG Bilateral Digital Humanities Program.

== Personal life ==
Tal Ilan speaks Hebrew, English, and German fluently. She is married and has two sons. She describes herself as a secular Jew and an atheist.

== Works ==
=== Books ===
- Women in Greco-Roman Palestine (1995; repr., Peabody, Mass.: Hendrickson, 1996)
- Mine and Yours are Hers: Retrieving Women's History from Rabbinic Literature, Arbeiten zur Geschichte des Antiken Judaismus
- Integrating Women into Second Temple History (1999)
- Silencing the Queen (2006)
- Massekehet Taanit (Feminist Commentary on the Babylonian Talmud. 2008)
- Lexicon of Jewish Names in Late Antiquity: 330 BCE - 650 CE (4 vols. 2002-2012)
- The New Jewish Inscriptions from Hierapolis and the Question of Jewish Diaspora Cemeteries Scripta classica Israelica: 25-28 Israel Society for the Promotion of Classical Studies (2006)
- Josephus and the Rabbis (2017)
- Mishnah Yevamot (unpublished)

=== Selected essays ===
- "A Pattern of Historical Errors in the Writings of Josephus". Zion (in Hebrew). 51: 357–60. 1986.
- "Julia Crispina Daughter of Berenicianus, A Herodian Princess in the Babatha Archive: A Case Study in Historical Identification". The Jewish Quarterly Review. 82: 361–81. February 1991.; Reprinted in Integrating Women, pp. 217–33.
- “‘Men Born of Woman ...’ (Job 14:1): The Phenomenon of Men Bearing Metronymes at the Time of Jesus,” Novum Testamentum 34 (1992) 23-45.
- "Biblical Women's Names in the Apocryphal Tradition". Journal for the Study of the Pseudepigrapha. 11: 3–67. 1993.
- “Jewish Studies and Women Studies: Where and When do they Meet?” Jewish Studies Quarterly 3 (1996) 162-73.
- "Names of the Hasmoneans,” The Jewish Quarterly Review 78 (1987) 1-20.
- “The New Jewish Inscriptions from Hierapolis and the Question of Jewish Diaspora Cemeteries,” Scripta Classica Israelica 25 (2006) 71-86.

=== Selected chapters ===
- Kitzberg, Ingrid Rosa, ed. (1999). "In the Footsteps of Jesus: Jewish Women in a Jewish Movement". Transformative Encounters: Jesus and Women Re-Viewed. Leiden: Brill. pp. 115–36.
- "Names and Naming". Encyclopedia of the Dead Sea Scrolls. New York: Oxford University Press. 2000. pp. 596–600.
- “Shelamzion Alexandra,” Encyclopedia of the Dead Sea Scrolls (New York: Oxford University Press; 2000) 872-4.
- “Joseph und Aseneth,” Religion in Geschichte und Gegenwart 4 (Tübingen: J.C.B. Mohr, 2001) 577.
