= University of Maryland, Baltimore =

Public university in Baltimore, Maryland, U.S.

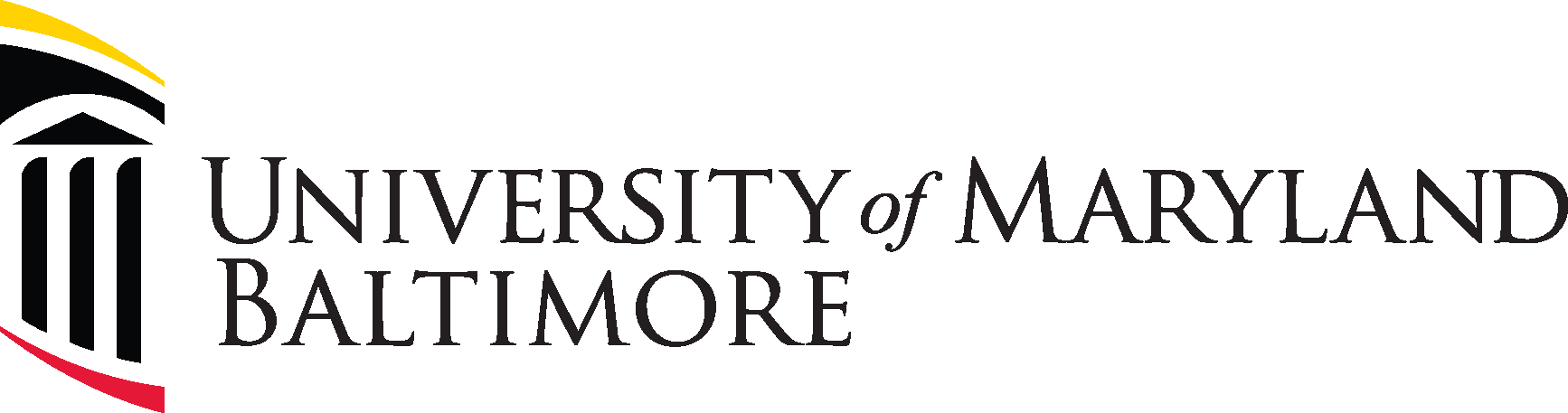
- Type: Public university
- Established: 1807; 219 years ago
- Parent institution: University System of Maryland
- Budget: $1.5 billion (2023)
- President: Bruce Jarrell
- Faculty: 2,321
- Undergraduates: 898
- Postgraduates: 6,239
- Location: Baltimore, Maryland, United States; 39°17′29″N 76°37′30″W
- Campus: Urban, 71 acres (0.29 km^{2}))
- Colors: Red, Gold and Black
- Website: umaryland.edu

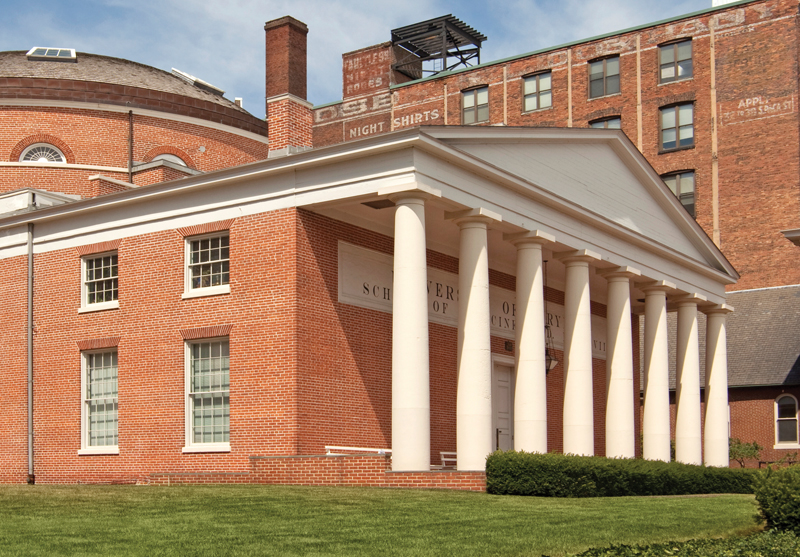
University of Maryland, Baltimore's historic Davidge Hall (1812) of the University of Maryland School of Medicine, at the northeast corner of South Greene and West Lombard Streets

The University of Maryland, Baltimore (UMB) is a public university in Baltimore, Maryland, United States. Founded in 1807, it is the second oldest college in Maryland and comprises some of the oldest professional schools of dentistry, law, medicine, pharmacy, social work and nursing in the United States. It is the original campus of the University System of Maryland and has a strategic partnership with the University of Maryland, College Park. Located on 71 acres (0.29 km^{2}) on the west side of downtown Baltimore, it is part of the University System of Maryland.

In 2012, the University of Maryland, Baltimore and the flagship University of Maryland, College Park united under the MPowering the State initiative to leverage the strengths of both institutions. The University of Maryland Strategic Partnership Act of 2016 officially formalized the partnership. According to the National Science Foundation, the university spent a combined $1.1 billion on research and development in 2019, ranking it 14th overall in the nation and 8th among all public institutions.

== History ==
The University of Maryland, Baltimore, was founded in 1807 as the Maryland College of Medicine. In 1812, it was rechartered as the University of Maryland and given the authority to establish additional faculties in law, divinity, and arts and sciences. The faculty of law was founded in 1816, though it operated intermittently until 1868. The faculty of arts and sciences known as the Baltimore College for undergraduates also operated intermittently in the early 19th century. From 1907 to 1920, St. John's College in Annapolis functioned as the University of Maryland's faculty of arts and sciences; this loose federation was dissolved in 1920 when the Maryland State College, (the former Maryland Agricultural College), founded 1856, as the state's land grant college, became part of a larger University of Maryland with the graduate level professional schools on the westside of downtown Baltimore. In 1970, the General Assembly of Maryland (state legislature) established a five-campus University of Maryland network comprising the

- University of Maryland, Baltimore (UMB) (professional graduate level schools);
- University of Maryland, Baltimore County (UMBC) (between Arbutus and Catonsville in southwest Baltimore County);
- University of Maryland, College Park (UMD) (flagship university);
- University of Maryland Eastern Shore (UMES) (at Princess Anne in Somerset County); and the
- University of Maryland Global Campus (UMGC) (extension and foreign programs)

with a system-wide president located in College Park and a chancellor in charge of each campus; in 1988 this institution was merged with the State University and College System of Maryland (of former normal and state teachers colleges, now wider liberal arts schools since the 1960s) to form the new University System of Maryland.

== Professional schools ==
=== School of Dentistry ===
The University of Maryland School of Dentistry was the first dental school in the world. Founded in 1840 as the Baltimore College of Dental Surgery (BCDS), it was chartered by an act of the Maryland General Assembly. Its principal founders were Drs. Horace H. Hayden and Chapin A. Harris. It was the first school in the world to offer a science-based curriculum in dentistry. It currently ranks among top 10 in the nation to receive NIH research funding. The school moved to a new building in October 2006. The new building, located adjacent to the old one on Baltimore Street, offers some of the newest facilities and technologies in the world for education and patient care. The cost of construction and equipment was over US$140 million, the highest spent by the state of Maryland on an academic building.

=== School of Law ===
The University of Maryland School of Law opened in 1816 as the "Maryland Law Institute" "in a spacious and commodious building on South Street, near Market street." (later renamed East Baltimore Street) It is the third-oldest law school in the nation. It was founded by David Hoffman, who authored a comprehensive course of legal study that had a lasting influence on other law school programs around the country and led to the development of legal ethics programs and responsibilities. The law school moved to a new building of English Tudor Revival architecture replacing its earlier modernistic structure on the same site at the northwest corner of West Baltimore and North Paca Streets in 2002, adjacent to the site to the north of the old Westminster Presbyterian Church and old Western Burying Grounds facing West Fayette and North Greene Streets (first laid out in 1787, on which the later church was built on top of resting on brick arched piers in 1852), the cemetery where the famous poet and writer Edgar Allan Poe (1809–1849) is buried. It is the only law school in the United States with a famous author buried on its campus. The former restored church building, now known as Westminster Hall is used for campus events and lectures and is often requested for wedding and other social ceremonies.

The University of Maryland School of Law was ranked 48th among law schools according to the 2017 edition of U.S. News & World Report law school rankings and was also ranked among the top 10 programs for health law, clinical law and environmental law. The School of Law's students' undergraduate median GPA is a 3.47 and median Law School Admissions Test (LSAT) score is a 158. It admits 52.4% of applicants. The law school takes about 225 full-time day students and about 50 evening students per year.

The current dean of the School of Law is Renée Hutchins, a leading expert on the Fourth Amendment and criminal appellate practice.

=== School of Medicine ===
Established in 1807 as the College of Medicine of Maryland, University of Maryland School of Medicine (UMB SOM) was the first public medical school in the United States and it is the fifth oldest medical school in the country. The campus includes Davidge Hall, designed by Robert Cary Long, Sr. in the style of the Pantheon in Rome, which was built in 1812 at the northeast corner of West Lombard and South Greene Streets, on the west side of downtown Baltimore, and is the oldest building in continuous use for medical education in the Hemisphere. UMB SOM was ranked 27th in U.S. News & World Report magazine's 2022 rankings of "Best Medical Schools: Research" and 12th in "Best Medical Schools: Primary Care".

The School of Medicine is closely affiliated with the University of Maryland Medical Center and Medical System. It houses the Department of Physical Therapy and Rehabilitation Sciences (PTRS), the Department of Medical and Research Technology (DMRT), and two research institutes, the Institute of Human Virology (IHV) and the Institute for Genome Sciences (IGS). It also offers PhD programs through the Graduate Program in Life Sciences and several combined degree programs: the MD/PhD MSTP (Medical Scientist Training Program), the MD/MPH (Master of Public Health), and an MD/MS in Public Health.

In a 2011 article in Forbes magazine, Steven Salzberg criticized the school's inclusion of pseudoscientific subjects such as homeopathy in the curriculum. According to Salzberg, the school is "mis-training medical students" by teaching courses in integrative medicine.

=== School of Nursing ===
The University of Maryland School of Nursing (UMSON), founded in 1889 by Florence Nightingale-trained nurse Louisa Parsons, is one of the oldest and largest nursing schools in the United States. In the 2015 edition of U.S. News & World Report magazine, the University of Maryland School of Nursing was ranked 6th nationally.

The UMSON building, which opened in November 1998, shares an urban 32-acre (130,000 m^{2}) campus on the west side of downtown Baltimore with five nearby professional schools — Dentistry, Law, Medicine, Pharmacy and Social Work — as well as the University of Maryland Medical System (formerly University of Maryland Hospital) and the U.S. Veterans Affairs Medical Center.

UMSON has pioneered the first nursing informatics program in the world and the nation's first nursing health policy program. More than 20 specialties are offered at the graduate level, including trauma/critical-care, oncology, gerontology, psychiatric/mental health nursing, and nursing administration. In 1999, the School of Nursing became the only school in Maryland to offer a midwifery program, pre-accredited by the American College of Nurse Midwives. Nurse practitioner options are also offered in family, pediatrics, women's health, neonatal intensive care, adult primary care, acute care and geriatrics.

Programs include the second bachelor's degree option, the RN to BSN online program, the RN to MS program, the post-baccalaureate entry option into the PhD program, and the MS/MBA and PhD/MBA programs offered in conjunction with the University of Baltimore; Frostburg State University; and the Robert H. Smith School of Business, at the University of Maryland, College Park. Partnership programs for BSN completion join the School of Nursing with the University of Maryland, Baltimore County, the University of Maryland, College Park, Washington College in Chestertown, Maryland, on the Eastern Shore of the Chesapeake Bay, as well as all of Maryland's community colleges.

To provide clinical programs for students, UMSON maintains affiliations with more than 300 hospitals and health care agencies throughout Maryland.

The University of Maryland School of Nursing Living History Museum, which opened in October 1999, examines the history of the nursing profession from its earliest days to present day.

=== School of Pharmacy ===
The University of Maryland School of Pharmacy, founded in 1841, is the fourth oldest school of pharmacy in the nation and was the first pharmacy school established in Maryland. The School of Pharmacy comprises three departments, Pharmacy Practice and Science, Pharmaceutical Sciences, and Pharmaceutical Health Services Research. The school admitted 11.4% of applicants for the 2006–2007 school year. According to the most recent pharmacy school rankings, The University of Maryland School of Pharmacy was ranked 9th among pharmacy schools in the 2016 edition of U.S. News & World Report.

=== School of Social Work ===
University of Maryland School of Social Work graduates have become policymakers at all levels of government, from the U.S. Senate to the state and federal courts, to the State Department and departments of social services. Graduates also work as educators and researchers at universities across the country and have become therapists, community organizers, and managers. In 2022, U.S. News & World Report ranked it 21st in the nation for social work.

=== School of Graduate Studies ===
The School of Graduate Studies was founded in 1918. It offers 43 degree programs in total and oversees the partnership between UMB and the University of Maryland, Baltimore County (UMBC) with additional programs that span across both institutions.

== Libraries ==
The University of Maryland, Baltimore has two main libraries on its campus: the Health Sciences & Human Services Library (HS/HSL) and the Thurgood Marshall Law Library.

UMB's Health Sciences & Human Services Library (HS/HSL) was founded in 1813 from the collection of Doctor John Crawford, a former British naval surgeon. Dr. Crawford's initial donation of books remains within the library's Historical Collections department as the Crawford Collection (comprising some 569 items). The first location of the library was the Provost's Office within the original medical school building, now known as Davidge Hall. Under the leadership of its first official library, Dr. Eugene F. Cordell (who served as library director from 1903 to 1913), the library grew rapidly, incorporating book collections from the schools of pharmacy and dentistry, and moving into its own building, a former church on the southeast corner of Lombard and Green Streets. The church was later razed in 1957 to make way for a new library that began construction in 1958 and opened in 1960. The library has since moved, in 1998, into a large modern building. The HS/HSL offers 45 group study rooms, 3 computer classrooms, several conference rooms with the web conferencing capability, and the Presentation Practice Studio, in addition to many study carrels and a number of public computers in a five-story building. In March, 2015, it opened the new Innovation Space designed for innovative and collaborative hands-on learning experience with 3D printers and 3D scanners.

The Thurgood Marshall Law Library, named for Baltimore native and Supreme Court Justice Thurgood Marshall, is the law library for the University of Maryland School of Law. The Marshall Law Library is found inside the law school's building, accessible through the main entrance. The Thurgood Marshall Law Library contains over 400,000 volumes of Anglo-American legal materials as well as outstanding international and foreign law collections. Extensive collections of both primary sources and secondary materials such as treatises are available. The library is open to all faculty, staff and students on the campuses of the University System of Maryland; University of Maryland School of Law alumni; attorneys; and members of the general public.

== Name of the institution ==
The professional schools housed at the University of Maryland, Baltimore, may also simply use the name "University of Maryland" when describing themselves even though the University of Maryland, College Park, also refers to itself simply as the University of Maryland. There is relatively little confusion resulting from the shared name because the University of Maryland, College Park, offers largely research-oriented graduate programs and houses fewer professional schools. The University of Maryland, Baltimore, does not offer NCAA sports. Although this university mainly offers graduate and professional study, it also offers a few undergraduate courses, which include nursing, dental hygiene, and medical technology. By law and tradition, each school is entitled to use the "University of Maryland" name in recognition of their shared history. While both schools are institutions which belong to the University System of Maryland, neither is a part of the other.

The University of Maryland, Baltimore is also often mistaken for the University of Maryland, Baltimore County (UMBC) and the University of Baltimore (UB) which are separate University System of Maryland institutions in Catonsville (outside the City of Baltimore) and Downtown Baltimore, respectively.

== Campus ==
Undergraduate demographics as of Fall 2023
Race and ethnicity	Total
Black	32%
White	27%
Asian	19%
Hispanic	13%
Two or more races	5%
International student	4%
Unknown	1%
Economic diversity
Low-income (Note: The percentage of students who received an income-based federal Pell grant intended for low-income students.)	26%
Affluent (Note: The percentage of students who are a part of the American middle class at the bare minimum.)	74%

The campus is composed of 58 buildings located near Camden Yards, the Baltimore Convention Center, and Baltimore's famous Lexington Market. Construction on a new 114,000-square-foot (10,600 m^{2}) campus center began at the start of 2007 and opened in August 2009 as the Southern Management Corporation Campus Center (SMC Center). The SMC Center contains dining facilities, meeting locations and the campus's gymnasium and recreation facility, URecFit. UMB has also recently undertaken a vast west campus expansion. This 10-acre (40,000 m^{2}) project, known as BioPark, created ten new buildings containing a total of 1,200,000 square feet (110,000 m^{2}) of classroom, lab, and office space. In addition, University of Maryland Medical System cleared a downtown site for the construction of a $329 million ambulatory care center.

The university is served by the University Center/Baltimore Street station of the Baltimore Light Rail system, which is at the eastern edge of campus. The Orange Route of the free Charm City Circulator provides service to both the BioPark and through the UMB campus to the Inner Harbor and points east. The university is also served by Camden Station, which connects the campus by MARC Train to the University of Maryland, College Park and Union Station in Washington, D.C.

Starting with the 2012–2013 school year, the university launched a new shuttle bus service for university students, staff, and faculty and University of Maryland Medical Center employees free of charge. The shuttle runs 3 routes from the university to West Baltimore (the BioPark center), Federal Hill, and Mount Vernon. The shuttle will discontinue its current service after summer 2019; the university is currently exploring transportation alternatives.

== Campus police ==
The university is protected through the University of Maryland, Baltimore Police Department. The UMB Police Department is a state- and nationally accredited police agency providing law enforcement services to the UMB campus and surrounding communities. Through an agreement signed between the UMB Police Department and the Baltimore Police Department, UMB Police officers have the same jurisdiction and authority as Baltimore Police officers throughout the campus of the university. The UMB Police Department is composed of both sworn police officers and unarmed security officers who are located in university-owned buildings to control access to the buildings and for other security purposes. The UMB Police Department also provides Safe Walk and Safe Ride services to students and university personnel throughout the campus and into surrounding neighborhoods.

In 2021, the University of Maryland, Baltimore Police Department was awarded the prestigious International Association of Chiefs of Police (IACP)/Walmart Leadership in Community Policing Award for a midsize agency. The department was also awarded the 2020 Maryland Chiefs of Police Association's Exceptional Police Performance by a Unit/Team/Collaboration Award for their Community Outreach and Support Team (COAST).

The UMB Police Department Community Outreach and Support Team (COAST) was created in 2018 by previous UMB Police Chief Alice Cary. The department is the third university police department in the country to welcome a comfort k-9, Officer Lexi and only one of two university Police Athletics/Activities Leagues (PAL) in the country. The department is a leader in homeless outreach and crisis intervention, working with the Law Enforcement Assisted Diversion (LEAD) to redirect low-level drug offenders into treatment. In Fall 2021, student interns from the School of Social Work will partner with the UMB Police Department to provide additional resources to vulnerable populations.

== Notable alumni ==
Governors

- Austin Lane Crothers, 46th governor of Maryland, from 1908 to 1912.
- Theodore R. McKeldin, 53rd governor of Maryland from 1951 to 1959
- Herbert O'Conor, 51st governor of Maryland from 1939 to 1947, U.S. Senate 1947–1953
- Martin O'Malley, (1988), Mayor of Baltimore, 1999–2006, and Governor of Maryland, 2007–2015.
- Albert Ritchie, 49th governor of Maryland from 1920 to 1935
- William S. Fulton, 4th governor of the Arkansas Territory, 1835–1836, and United States Senator for Arkansas, 1836–1844.

U.S. senators

- Daniel B. Brewster, U.S. senator for Maryland, 1963–1969; congressman for Maryland's 2nd District, 1959–1963
- William Cabell Bruce, (1882), U.S. senator from Maryland from 1923 to 1929.
- Ben Cardin, (1967), U.S. congressman for United States House of Representatives, 1987–2007, and U.S. senator from Maryland, 2007–present.
- Charles Mathias, Jr., U.S. senator from Maryland from 1969 to 1987.
- Barbara Mikulski, (1965), U.S. senator from Maryland from 1987 to 2016.
- George L. P. Radcliffe, (1903), U.S. senator from Maryland from 1935 to 1947
- Isidor Rayner, U.S. senator from Maryland from 1905 to 1912.
- Joseph Tydings, (1953), U.S. senator from Maryland from 1965 to 1971
- Millard Tydings, U.S. senator from Maryland from 1927 to 1951.

U.S. congressmen

- William Purington Cole, Jr., U.S. congressman from Maryland's 2nd District, 1927–1929 & 1931–1942
- Elijah Cummings, (1976), U.S. congressman for Maryland's 7th District, 1996–2019
- John Charles Linthicum, (1890), U.S. congressman for Maryland's 4th District, 1911–1932
- Hugh Meade, (1932), U.S. congressman for Maryland 2nd District, 1947–1949
- Eric Swalwell, (2006), U.S. congressman for California's 14th District, 2013–2026

State senators

- Thomas V. Mike Miller, Jr., president of State Senate from 1987 to 2020

State Delegates

- James W. Campbell, (1976), former member of Maryland House of Delegates
- Adelaide C. Eckardt, (1978), (1981), member Maryland House of Delegates
- Donald B. Elliott, (1957), member Maryland House of Delegates.
- Louise Virginia Snodgrass, former member of Maryland House of Delegates

Judges

- Lynne A. Battaglia, (1974), Maryland State Supreme Court judge (Maryland Court of Appeals), 2001–present
- Andre M. Davis, (1978), judge, U.S. District Court for the District of Maryland, 1995–2009; judge U.S. Court of Appeals for the Fourth Circuit 2009–present.
- Clayton Greene, Jr., (1976), Maryland State Supreme Court judge (Maryland Court of Appeals), 2004–present
- Glenn T. Harrell, Jr., (1970), Maryland State Supreme Court judge (Maryland Court of Appeals), 1999–present
- Alan M. Wilner, (1962), Maryland State Supreme Court judge (Maryland Court of Appeals), 1996–present

Science and Medicine

- Deborah Benzil, (M.D. 1985), Vice-chair of Neurosurgery at Cleveland Clinic, Professor of Neurosurgery at Cleveland Clinic Lerner College of Medicine
- J. Bart Classen, immunologist and anti-vaccinationist
- Dr. Antonio Fernós-Isern, first Puerto Rican cardiologist and its longest serving resident commissioner.
- Archibald "Moonlight" Graham, (1908), physician, Major League Baseball player, portrayed in the film Field of Dreams
- Samuel Mudd, physician, convicted of aiding and abetting the assassination of Abraham Lincoln
- Enrique Pérez Santiago, first Puerto Rican hematologist
- F. Mason Sones, (1943), cardiologist, inventor of coronary angiography
- Theodore E. Woodward, Nobel Prize nominee, renowned researcher in the field of medicine

Others

- Charles C. Byrne, U.S. Army general
- Louis L. Goldstein, (1938), Maryland Comptroller of the Treasury, 1959–1998
- Robert M. Parker Jr., (1973), considered world's leading wine critic
- William C. Schmeisser, (1907), National Lacrosse Hall of Fame inductee
- Wendy Sherman, (1976), former United States Deputy Secretary of State
- James T. Smith, (1968), Baltimore County Executive, 2002–2010

== Notable faculty ==
- Brajesh Lal, surgeon and expert in the prevention and treatment of stroke and venous disease
- Dan K. Morhaim, current member of Maryland House of Delegates.
