= Jennifer Sheridan Moss =

American papyrologist

Jennifer Sheridan Moss is Professor of Latin and Classics at Wayne State University. She is an expert in papyrology and president of the American Society of Papyrologists for 2015–17. She also served as a director of the Society for Classical Studies from 2020 to 2023.

== Bibliography ==
- 'Not Lost in Translation. Lessons Learned from Teaching Outside my Comfort Zone', Eidolon (2018) https://eidolon.pub/not-lost-in-translation-b1cb8d8f52bc
- "Women in Late Antique Egypt', Companion to Women in the Ancient World, ed. by Sharon James and Sheila Dillon (2012)
