= Brajesh K. Lal =

American surgeon

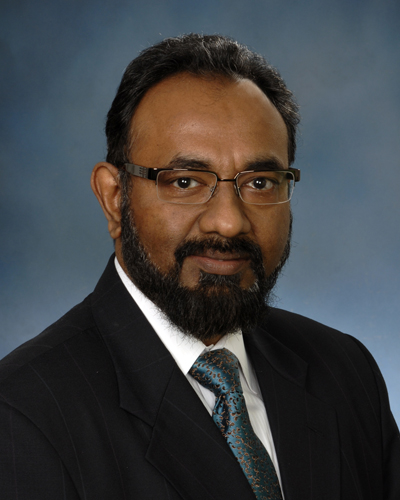
- Born: Varanasi, India
- Education: All India Institutes of Medical Sciences (MD); Rutgers-NJMS
- Occupation: Vascular Surgeon
- Medical career
- Institutions: University of Maryland; Mayo Clinic; George Mason University; National Institute of Health (NIH); Baltimore VA Medical Center
- Research: Cerebrovascular Disease; Vascular Surgery

Brajesh K. Lal, born in 1963 in Varanasi, India and of Indian origin, is an American surgeon, and an expert in vascular disease, particularly the prevention and treatment of stroke and venous disease. He is a tenured Professor of Vascular Surgery at the University of Maryland and Professor of Neurology at Mayo Clinic. He holds additional appointments at the Departments of Bioengineering at the University of Maryland and George Mason University. He founded and currently directs the multi-specialty Center for Vascular Research and the NIH Vascular Imaging Core Facility at the University of Maryland. He has been elected as a Distinguished Fellow of the Society for Vascular Surgery and Distinguished Fellow of the American Venous Forum.

== Early life and education ==
Lal completed his high school education at La Martiniere, one of India's oldest schools. He earned his graduate degree at the prestigious All India Institute of Medical Sciences. He spent two years in the Fogarty Research Fellowship program at the National Institutes of Health in Bethesda, MD. After his fellowship at NIH, he completed his surgical residency and vascular surgery fellowship at Rutgers University, New Jersey.

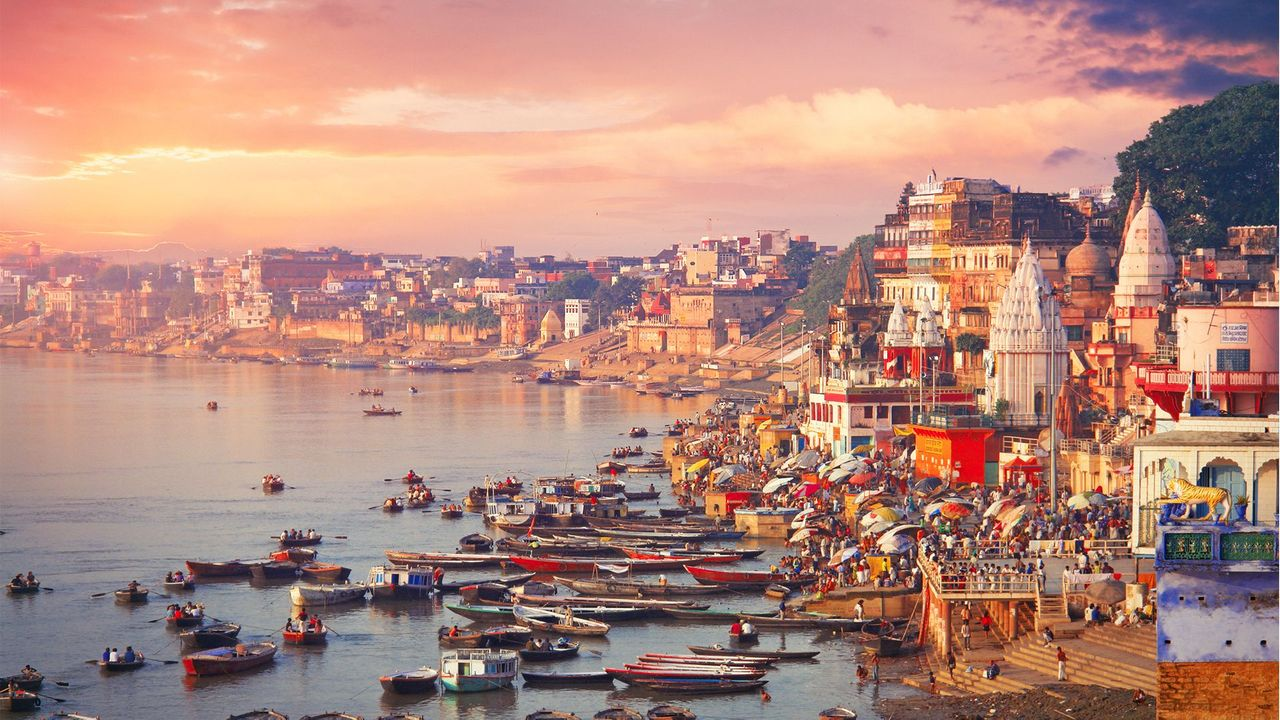
Varanasi, India

== Academic work ==
Lal's contributions are focused on two major vascular illnesses that affect millions of patients every year and that are major causes of death and disability: carotid artery disease and venous disease.

=== Center for Vascular Research ===
The Center for Vascular Research was created by Brajesh Lal.

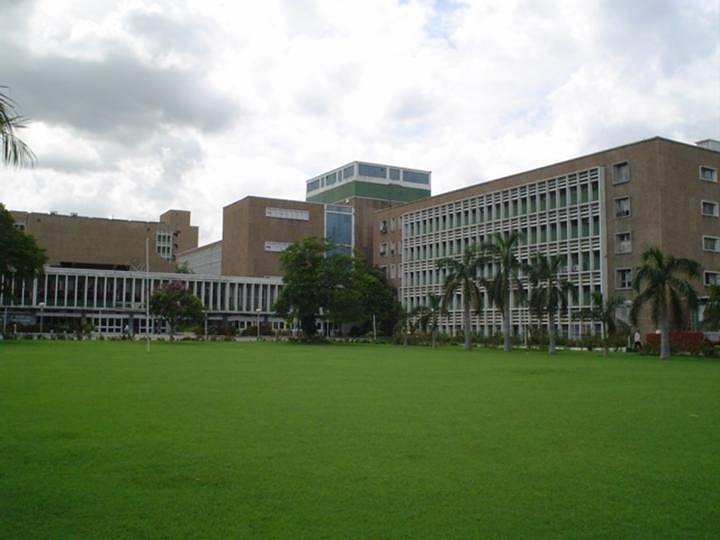
All India Institute of Medical Sciences, New Delhi

=== Carotid disease and cognitive-mobility dysfunction ===
Lal's research on how progressive narrowing of the carotid artery reduces brain perfusion has led to the discovery of cognitive and mobility dysfunction as new, previously unsuspected morbidities of carotid artery disease. These findings are leading to a shift on how this disease is viewed. Even without causing a stroke, carotid stenosis leads to chronic disabilities that impact quality of life. Since carotid blockages affect 5 – 10% of all older adults, these newly discovered problems affect a large and vulnerable group of people. He delivered the Clemens Lecture at Yale School of Medicine on this topic. He is now conducting clinical trials to test whether medications, exercise interventions, surgical correction, and endovascular correction of the blockage can reverse these morbidities.

=== Carotid disease and stroke ===
Lal's research on carotid disease contributed to the introduction of minimally invasive carotid artery stenting as an alternative to surgery in selected patients at risk for developing a stroke. He has participated in writing the guidelines used for treating carotid disease in the US. He is now leading the world's largest randomized clinical trial to help determine whether blockages in the carotid artery are best treated with medications or with surgery. This trial is being conducted across 170 medical centers in the United States, Canada, Israel, Spain, and Australia.

He has recently introduced artificial intelligence algorithms to detect geometric and tissue characteristics of plaques building up within carotid arteries to identify patients with a high risk for future strokes. This research will also identify patients with a low risk of stroke who can be spared unnecessary procedures.

=== Venous disease ===
His research on venous hemodynamics has led to the discovery that increasing venous blood flow through aerobic exercise can accelerate thrombus resolution and prevent chronic post-thrombotic syndrome in patients with acute deep vein thrombosis (DVT). He is currently using artificial intelligence algorithms to discover new risk factors for DVT using information from over 9 million hospitalized patients. This is one of the first applications of deep learning techniques in evaluating venous disease.

=== COVID-19 pandemic ===
He evaluated the impact of the COVID-19 pandemic-related disruptions in healthcare services on long-term outcomes on vascular disease and cancer. His goal was to help design informed solutions for the recovery period once the pandemic receded. His research identified a large and unsuspected deficit in diagnoses of new cancers, raised concerns for a future epidemic of late-stage cancers, and helped prepare healthcare institutions for the increased need for screening activities after the pandemic. His investigations informed the VA National Surgical Office and impacted their decision-making at a national level.

== CREST family of clinical trials ==
=== CREST Trial ===
The CREST trial, with Brajesh Lal as its Director of Operations, examined the efficacy and safety of carotid artery stenting compared to carotid endarterectomy for the treatment of carotid artery disease. This landmark study contributed significantly to the understanding of treatment options for patients at risk of stroke due to carotid artery blockages. The trial's findings have influenced medical practice, guidelines, and coverage decisions by federal authorities for the management of carotid artery disease.

=== CREST-2 Trial ===
Building on the CREST trial, Brajesh Lal serves as the surgical lead of the CREST-2 trial, a multicenter study focused on the management of asymptomatic carotid artery disease. The trial consists of two parallel studies comparing intensive medical therapy alone with medical therapy plus carotid revascularization (carotid artery stenting or carotid endarterectomy). Results demonstrated that carotid artery stenting significantly reduced the risk of stroke or death at 4 years, when compared with medical therapy alone. The trial's findings continue to influence medical practice, guidelines, and coverage decisions by federal authorities for the management of carotid artery disease.

=== CREST-2 Registry (C2R) ===
C2R is an effort to ensure that high quality operators are performing carotid stenting at centers with adequate resources across the United States. Under Brajesh’s leadership, a group of physicians have come together to form a Steering committee that oversees the Registry. Information pertaining to the diagnosis, indications, procedural details and outcomes of carotid artery stenting are reviewed for quality control of individual stentors at over 100 centers across the US. Lessons learned from C2R have informed the best criteria that define high standards for carotid stenting.

== ACCOF family of clinical trials ==
=== Asymptomatic Carotid Stenosis: Cognitive Function and Plaque Correlates (ACCOF-1) ===
Led by Brajesh, this study identified that so called “asymptomatic” carotid stenosis actually has a negative impact on cognitive function. The study also introduced a novel 3D ultrasound technique to assess carotid plaque morphology, including its geometry and tissue composition. These detailed plaque features are now being correlated with future clinical outcomes with the ultimate goal of identifying patients at risk for developing cognitive impairment.

=== Asymptomatic Carotid Stenosis: Cognitive Function and Plaque Correlates – 2 (ACCOF-2) ===
In the ACCOF-2 study, he is focusing on patients with high-grade stenosis (>70%) of the carotid artery. The study is testing whether removing the stenosis can halt or improve cognitive impairment in these patients. The study tests cognitive function in these patients at baseline and then after they have undergone a revascularization procedure. If the results are positive, it will have a large impact on public health by identifying, for the first time a surgically correctable cause of cognitive impairment in older individuals.

=== Asymptomatic Carotid Stenosis: Cognitive Function and Plaque Correlates - Exercise Intervention (ACCOF-EX) ===
ACCOF-EX is a clinical study of patients with moderate stenosis (50-69%) of the carotid artery. The study involves assessing whether a 12-week aerobic exercise and balance training program can halt or improve cognitive impairment of these patients.

== Other academic work and positions held ==
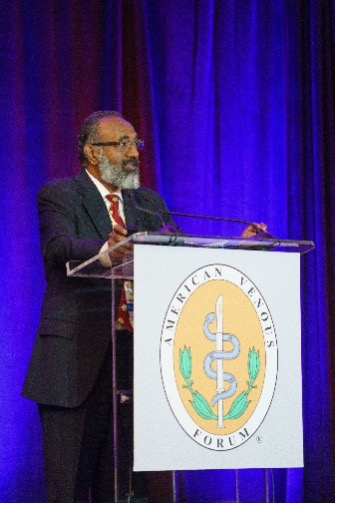
Dr. Lal delivering the Presidential address at the 32nd AVF annual meeting, Amelia Island, Florida

Brajesh is a past president of the American Venous Forum (AVF), past president and founding member of the South Asian American Society for Vascular Surgeons (SAAVS) and a past president of the Eastern Vascular Society (EVS). He was the program director of the second oldest vascular fellowship training program in the United States at Rutgers University and has trained over 100 vascular surgeons. His research Center has been continuously funded by the National Institutes of Health (NIH) and the Veterans Affairs (VA) Research Department for the past 15 years, where he has trained over 100 vascular researchers. He has published over 400 manuscripts, abstracts, and book chapters and has chaired several Vascular Guidelines for the Society for Vascular Surgery. He is a fellow of the American College of Surgeons and has received the Faculty Research Award from the American College of Surgeons.
