= Hayim Lapin =

Hayim Lapin is an American Jewish studies and history scholar, currently Robert H. Smith Professor of Jewish Studies and History and director of the Joseph and Rebecca Meyerhoff Program and Center for Jewish Studies at the University of Maryland, College Park.

== Education ==
Lapin received bachelor's degrees from Columbia University in Ancient Studies in 1986 and from the Jewish Theological Seminary of America in Jewish History in 1987, a master's degree from the Jewish Theological Seminary in Talmud in 1987, and a PhD from Columbia in Religion in 1994.

== Career ==
From 1991 to 1993, Lapin was adjunct assistant professor of history at the State University of New York at Purchase. In 1993–1994, he was assistant professor of Rabbinics and Ancient Jewish History at Baltimore Hebrew University. In 1994, he joined the University of Maryland, where he served as assistant professor in the Department of History from 1994 to 1998, associate professor from 1998 to 2005, and since 2005 as professor. In 2010, he was appointed Robert H. Smith Professor of Jewish Studies.

As a professor of Jewish studies at Maryland, Lapin studies the history and literature of the Jews in late antiquity. He thus investigates where the Rabbis came from, the origins of the synagogue and the prayers, and how Jews coped with Roman rule.

Lapin served as the director of the Joseph and Rebecca Meyerhoff Program and Center for Jewish Studies at the University of Maryland from 2006 to 2011. And he became the director of the Jewish Studies Program again in May 2017.

As director of the center, Lapin invited Michael Twitty, a food blogger and Judaic studies teacher from Washington, D.C., to speak to University of Maryland students about the intersection of Judaism and African-American culture. Lapin said that Twitty is "someone who crosses all sorts of boundaries and encourages us to talk about all sorts of issues that are important on campus and the wider community." And in December 2019, he invited a Sephardic law and ethics professor from Bar-Ilan University to the University of Maryland to discuss his discovery and translation of an 18th-century story about a Rabbi and a Sheikh.

In May 2019, Lapin reported that the Jewish studies major at the university was being redesigned, saying: “We’re going to take a real serious look at the fact that we don’t have a lot of majors and what can we do to encourage majors.” Lapin attributed the recent decrease in students in the program to campus recruiters’ “emphasis” on bringing in STEM majors as well as “the interest in career-oriented majors on the part of students.” Lapin suggested that another big change in the program will be in having students develop an area of interest and concentrate on that area of interest. He related that the department was also questioning how much Hebrew the curriculum should have, saying: “We require more Hebrew than most other majors, which makes it more like a language major in some respects.” Lapin also reported that the program was working on creating other majors as well, saying: “We have a new major in Ancient Middle Eastern Studies,” which was in the process of being reviewed by the university.

At a Digital Humanities session at a joint conference of the Society of Biblical Literature and American Academy of Religion in San Diego in November 2019, Lapin presented with Professor Daniel Stökl Ben Ezra of the École pratique des hautes études on “Automatic Transcriptions of Medieval Hebrew Manuscripts and Crowdsourcing Their Corrections.” They discussed digital rendering of Hebrew texts, which involve data points at the level of the letter or stroke. They told how they were originally at 3 errors per 100 characters, and are now at 1.8. They reported that computers can learn to recognize letters extended to fill a line of text.

In January 2020, after a two-year review process by Lapin and Maxine Grossman, another Jewish Studies professor who joined him in its development, the Maryland Higher Education Commission approved a new major focused on religions of the ancient Middle East. The 30-credit program will study the emergence of ancient Judaism, Christianity, and early Islam between 850 CE and 1200 CE.

With professors Shaye J. D. Cohen and Robert Goldenberg, Lapin edited The Oxford Annotated Mishnah.

== Publications ==
Lapin has written many articles on rabbis and rabbinic culture in late antiquity and is working on a digital edition of the Mishnah. His publications include:

- “An Application to Lease Katoikic Land.” Bulletin of the American Society of Papyrologists, volume 28 (1991): pages 153–61.
- “Palm Fronds and Citrons: Notes on Two Letters from Bar Kosiba's Administration.” Hebrew Union College Annual, volume 64 (1993): pages 111–35.
- “Early Rabbinic Civil Law and the Literature of the Second Temple Period.” Jewish Studies Quarterly, volume 2 (number 2) (1995): pages 149–83.
- Early Rabbinic Civil Law and the Social History of Roman Galilee: A Study of Mishnah Tractate Baba' Mesi'a'. Atlanta: Scholars Press, 1995. ISBN 0-7885-0204-2.
- Religious and Ethnic Communities in Later Roman Palestine. Edited Hayim Lapin. Bethesda: Capital Decisions Ltd, 1998. ISBN 978-1883053314.
- “Rabbis and Cities in Later Roman Palestine: A Survey of the Literary Evidence,” Journal of Jewish Studies, volume 50 (1999): pages 187–207.
- “The Social Structure of the Rabbinic Movement in Roman Palestine by Catherine Hezser.” Review by Hayim Lapin. AJS Review, volume 24 (number 2) (1999): pages 378–80.
- “The City in Roman Palestine by Daniel Sperber.” Review by Hayim Lapin. AJS Review, volume 25 (number 1) (2000–2001): pages 107–09.
- Economy, Geography, and Provincial History in Later Roman Palestine. Mohr Siebeck, 2001. ISBN 978-3161475887.
- “The Cambridge History of Judaism. Volume 3: The Early Roman Period by William Horbury, W. D. Davies, John Sturdy.” Review by Hayim Lapin. Shofar, volume 20 (number 4) (summer 2002): pages 155–57.
- Jews, Antiquity, and the Nineteenth-Century Imagination. Edited by Hayim Lapin and Dale B. Martin. University Press of Maryland, 2003. ISBN 978-1883053789.
- “The Origins and Development of the Rabbinic Movement in the Land of Israel,” chapter 8 of The Cambridge History of Judaism: Volume Four: The Late Roman-Rabbinic Period, pages 206–29. Cambridge: Cambridge University Press, 2006. ISBN 978-0521772488.
- “The Construction of Households in the Mishnah.” In The Mishnah in Contemporary Perspective. Edited by Alan J. Avery-Peck and Jacob Neusner. Brill Academic Publishers, 2006. ISBN 978-9004152205.
- “Epigraphical Rabbis: A Reconsideration.” The Jewish Quarterly Review, volume 101 (number 3) (Summer 2011): pages 311–46.
- Shaping the Middle East: Jews, Christians, and Muslims in an Age of Transition, 400–800 C.E. Edited by Kenneth G. Holum and Hayim Lapin. Bethesda: University Press of Maryland, 2011. ISBN 978-1934309315.
- Rabbis as Romans: The Rabbinic Movement in Palestine, 100–400 CE. Oxford: Oxford University Press, 2012. ISBN 978-0-19-517930-9.
