= Archives of the History of American Psychology =

The Archives of the History of American Psychology (AHAP) is a large collection of historical papers, instruments, films, photographs, and artifacts located at the University of Akron, in Akron, Ohio.

== History ==
The Archives of the History of American Psychology was established in 1965 at the University of Akron. Since the beginning, its main focus has been the collection of manuscripts which includes papers from over 740 psychologists.

The Archives have been expanding continuously since then, with the establishment in 1976 of the Child Development Film Archives. In 1980, numerous gifts of books were added to the collection, and they include published literature dealing with the "substantive content of psychology as well as with its history and philosophy." The Archives of the History of American Psychology is a subject-matter archives.

== Collection ==
The collection contains over 740 individual collections, 50 records from organizations, 1,000 instruments and apparatuses, 6,000 film records, 15,000 images, 6,000 three-dimensional as well as paper and pencil tests, and 50,000 volumes including rare books, textbooks, professional and trade publications.

=== Notable items ===
Contained in the collection are many well-known artifacts of psychology. These include:

- Gowns from Philip Zimbardo's Stanford prison experiment
- The shock box from Stanley Milgram's experiments on obedience
- The inflatable doll from Albert Bandura's Bobo doll experiment

== New facility ==
A wall-breaking ceremony was held on February 26, 2010 in order to mark the beginning of the renovation of the old Roadway Express records building, which was built in 1916. AHAP's prior home in the basement of the Polsky building, which provided only 10,000 square feet (930 m^{2}) of storage space and lacked a prominent location, helped fuel the decision for the facility to re-locate. The new Center for the History of Psychology (CHP), opened August 30, 2010 with 75,000 square feet (7,000 m^{2}) of space available, houses not only AHAP but also a museum of psychology and a space for the preservation and digitization of historical materials.

Current funding allowed for the renovation of the first floor of the four-story facility, with the other areas of the building being completed as more funds are secured. The first floor houses the gallery, the reading room, office space, and some collections.

== See also ==
- Milgram experiment
- Stanford prison experiment
- History of psychology
- List of psychology organizations
- University of Akron
