= Herman Rosenthal =

American author, editor and librarian

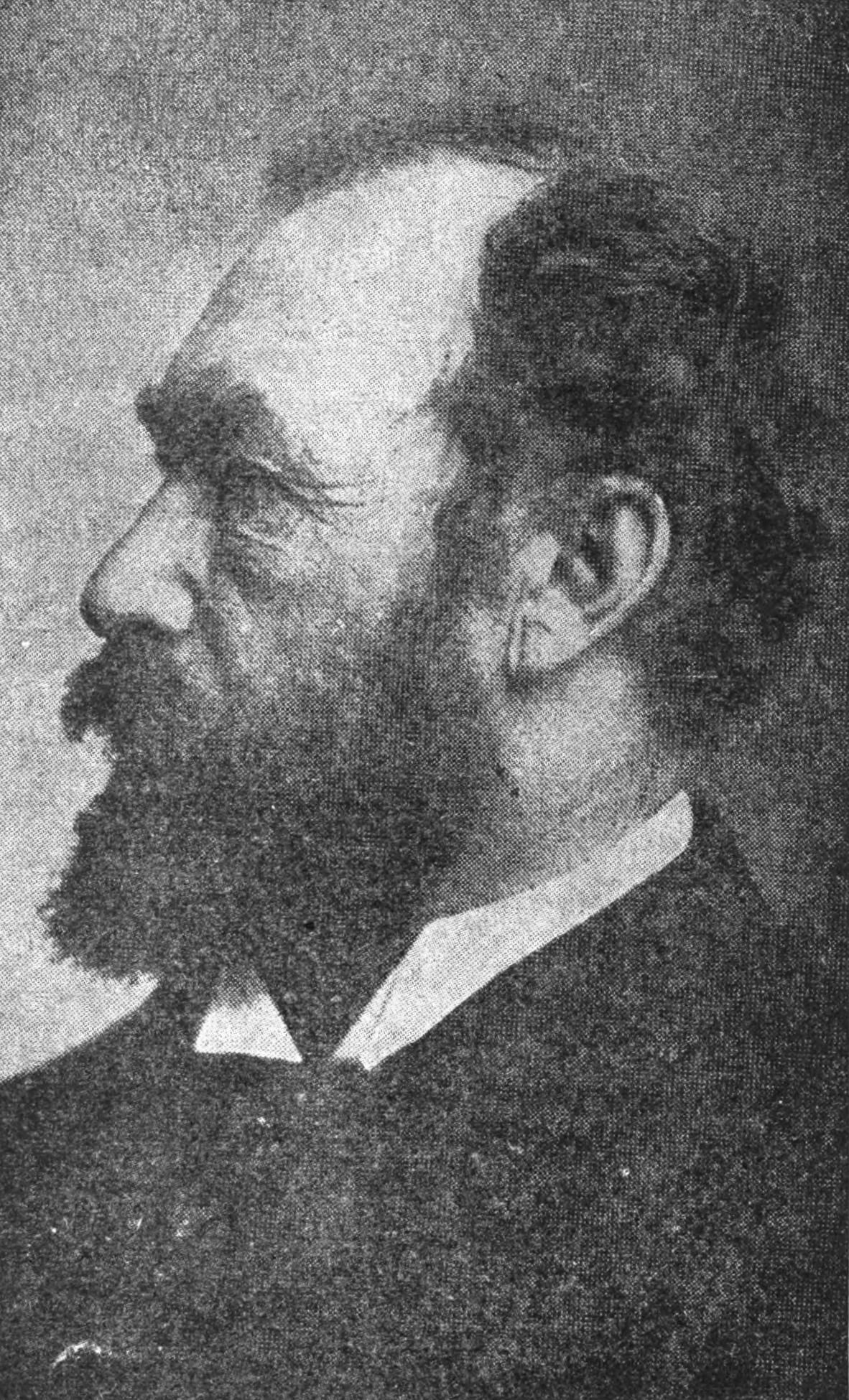
Herman Rosenthal

Herman Rosenthal (October 6, 1843 – 1917) was an American author, editor, and librarian.

== Biography ==
Rosenthal was born in Friedrichstadt (Jaunjelgava), Courland. He was educated at Bauske (Bauska) and Jakobstadt (Jēkabpils), graduating in 1859. In that year he translated into German several of Nekrasov's poems. In 1869 he engaged in the printing trade at Krementchug, and in 1870 he published a collection of poems, Gedichte. In the Russo-Turkish war he served in the Russian Red Cross Society and received the society's medal for distinguished service (1877–78). Returning to his craft as master-printer, he pursued it in Smyela, government of Kyiv, and in the city of Kiev (Kyiv) until 1881. He produced a humorous story, "Die Wunderliche Kur," in 1872, and later assisted in the founding of Zarya (Dawn), a daily paper, the first number of which appeared at Kiev in 1878. At this time Rosenthal was elected corresponding member of the St. Petersburg Society for the Promotion of Culture Among the Russian Jews.

Interested in the condition of his oppressed coreligionists, Rosenthal sailed for the United States in 1881 for the purpose of founding there agricultural colonies to be settled by Russian Jewish immigrants. During 1881–82 he succeeded in establishing colonies in Louisiana and South Dakota. As a resident, he took a prominent part in the administration of the Woodbine, New Jersey, colony in 1891. During 1887 and 1888 Rosenthal engaged in the book-trade, but gave up this occupation on being appointed chief statistician of the Edison General Electric Company, a post he held for three years. In 1892 he went to the Far East, whither he was sent by the Great Northern Railway to investigate the economic conditions and trade of China, Korea, and Japan, on which he published a report (St. Paul, 1893). On his return he was elected secretary of the German-American Reform Union, New York City, and a member of the press bureau of the Committee of Seventy, which was instrumental in the overthrown of the notorious Tweed Ring. In 1894 he was appointed chief of the discharging department of the Immigration Bureau, Ellis Island, New York, an office he occupied two years. In 1897, he became a vice president of the Federation of American Zionists of New York. In 1898 he accepted the post of chief of the Slavonic Department, New York Public Library (Astor branch), a position he held until 1917. He joined the editorial board of the Jewish Encyclopedia as Chief of the Russian department in December 1900.

Rosenthal has been prominently connected with Hebrew literature and with the development of the Haskalah movement in Russia. He contributed (1859–67) to Ha-Melitz and other Hebrew periodicals, and corresponded with Jacob Reifmann, Leon Gordon, Zweifel, Zederbaum, Fuenn, and other Hebrew scholars. In the United States he edited and published, together with A. Rosenberg, the Hebrew monthly Ha-Modia' le-Chodashim (1901). In 1894 Rosenthal founded the society "Ohole Shem," of which he served as president.

Rosenthal translated into German verse "Ecclesiastes" ("Worte des Sammlers"), New York, 1885, 2d ed. 1893, and the "Song of Songs" ("Lied der Lieder"), 1893, and, into English, a work by Hugo Ganz, The Land of Riddles, New York, 1905.

His eldest son, Max Rosenthal, born at Krementchug, government of Poltava, Russia, June 6, 1865, was educated for the medical profession at the universities of Bern, Berlin, and Leipzig (M.D. 1887). In 1888 he became house surgeon at St. Mark's Hospital, New York City, and for two years he was senior resident physician at the Montefiore Home. He became gynecologist at the German Dispensary and attending gynecologist at the Sydenham Hospital. His other son, George D. Rosenthal, born 1869, was manager of the Edison General Electric Company at St. Louis.
