= International Council of Fine Arts Deans =

The International Council of Fine Arts Deans (ICFAD) (d.b.a. International Council for Arts Deans) is a global organization of deans, associate and assistant deans, directors and chairs, and other arts executives leading arts and design programs in higher education. It was founded in 1964.

== Background ==
The organization explores challenges and opportunities within the realms of leadership, administration, and the disciplines of arts and design. The members of ICFAD are hundreds of arts deans throughout North America and around the world. ICFAD focuses on issues concerning creative units in higher education including fine and performing arts, design, film, arts education, art history, architecture and communication.

== History ==
The organization originated in September 1963 during the National Council of Arts in Education (NCAIE) meeting in Pittsburgh, Pennsylvania. Initially named the National Council of Fine Arts Deans (NCFAD), the organization formalized its rules in 1964 during the NCAIE meeting in Oberlin, Ohio.

Until 1978, ICFAD operated informally, but in 1979, it adopted a new organizational structure with elected officers and gained nonprofit status.

== Officers ==
James Frazier, Dean of the College of Fine Arts at Florida State University, is now serving as President.

Eileen Strempel, Inaugural Dean of The UCLA Herb Alpert School of Music, has been elected to a two-year term as Secretary.

Sabrina Madison-Cannon, Dean of School of Music and Dance at University of Oregon, was appointed to serve as the association’s Treasurer.

Nancy Uscher, Dean of the College of Fine Arts at the University of Nevada Las Vegas, is now serving as Immediate Past President.
