= Deborah Benzil =

American neurosurgeon

Deborah L. Benzil is an American neurosurgeon specializing in brain and spine tumors, stereotactic radiosurgery, socioeconomic education. She was awarded the Anthony Greto Fellowship from the Association of Brain Tumor Research. She is the Vice Chair and professor of neurosurgery at the Cleveland Clinic in Cleveland, Ohio, USA.

She has previously served as the Vice President of the American Association of Neurological Surgeons, one of the largest neurosurgical societies in the United States, past chair of the Council of State Neurosurgical Societies, and the founder of Women in Neurosurgery.

== Early life and education ==
Deborah L. Benzil was raised rural Maryland. She attended Brown University as an undergraduate, receiving her degree with honors in 1981. She graduated from the University of Maryland School of Medicine in 1985, then moved on to the U.S. National Institutes of Health for a fellowship in surgical neurology from 1985–1987. From 1988–1994, Benzil was a neurosurgery resident at Brown University and Rhode Island Hospital, where she was granted the Association of Brain Tumor Research's Anthony Greto Fellowship for her research on brain tumors.

== Career and research ==
In 1994, Benzil joined the faculty of New York Medical College as an assistant professor. In 2018, she moved to the Cleveland Clinic as Vice Chair of the department of neurosurgery.

== Publications ==
Benzil's publications focus primarily on tumors, stereotactic radiosurgery, resident education, and socioeconomic issues.

== Awards and honors ==
- Phi Beta Kappa
- New York Magazine, top Doctors
- Castle Connolly Top Doctors, Westchester
- Castle Connolly Top Doctors, Hudson Valley
- Plantree Physician Award, Northern Westchester Hospital
- Hats Off Award, Westchester Medical Center

== Personal life ==
Benzil's and her husband – also a molecular biologist – have two children.
