= Sharon James =

American classical philologist

Sharon Lynn James (2 January 1960 – 28 December 2023) was a Classicist and Professor of Classics at University of North Carolina at Chapel Hill. She was an expert in Latin poetry, women and gender in antiquity, New Comedy, and Italian epic.

== Education ==
James received her PhD in 1991 in Comparative Literature from the University of California at Berkeley. Her doctoral thesis, "Dolcezza di figlio, pieta del vecchio padre": Parents and Children in the Iliad, the Aeneid, and the Divine Comedy, examined child-parent relationships in Homer, Vergil, and Dante.

== Career ==
James began her career teaching at Hamilton College, Bryn Mawr College, and the University of California, Santa Cruz. She joined UNC-Chapel Hill in 1999, teaching there for 24 years.

External videos
- Recordings of the performances, some of which are in Latin
- Sharon James' YouTube channel

In 2012, James co-led an NEH summer institute program, "Roman Comedy in Performance."

Following her death, James was described as 'a pioneer in the scholarship and teaching of women in antiquity'. She held numerous national leadership positions, including chair for the Society for Classical Studies Membership Committee (2018–2021), sitting on the editorial board of the journal Mouseion (2012–2015); and serving on the prize committee for the American Journal of Philology (2016–2018).

== Bibliography ==
- Learned Girls and Male Persuasion: Gender and Reading in Roman Love Elegy (University of California Press, 2003)
- (edited by Sharon James and Sheila Dillon) A Companion to Women in the Ancient World (London: Blackwells, 2012)
- (Dorota Dutsch, Sharon James, and David Konstan) Women in Roman Republication Drama (Wisconsin: University of Wisconsin Press, 2015)
- (edited by Sharon James and Sheila Dillon) Women in the Classical World (London: Routledge, 2017)
- (edited by Sharon James) Golden Cynthia. Essays on Propertius (Michigan: University of Michigan Press, 2022)
