= ASC Healthcare =

British mental health service provider

ASC Healthcare is a mental health service provider based in Bolton, Greater Manchester. It runs the Breightmet Centre, an autism treatment centre in Bolton, which opened in 2013. Additionally, for a short period, it also ran a small hospital called Mayfield Court in Whalley Range, which was used for short term placements of mental health patients. In 2019 ASC Healthcare proposed a similar acute crisis unit for mental health patients in Blackburn be opened.

The Breightmet Centre, which took patients from all over England, was forced to shut suddenly after "serious concerns" were raised by the Care Quality Commission in July 2019 and its registration was revoked. The inspectors identified serious concerns both with the centre’s physical environment and with the company’s understanding of patients' healthcare needs. The site was dirty, with food and human waste in some of the bedrooms and social areas. Services were taken over by Mersey Care NHS Foundation Trust. It was rated “Good” in 2018. A second inspection appears to have been undertaken as a direct result of complaints raised by a parent of a 20-year old resident from Gloucestershire, who reported that both she and her son were absolutely traumatised.

Subsequently Mayfield Court, which was used by NHS trusts when there were no available NHS beds, was also inspected by the Care Quality Commission. It was rated ‘inadequate’ overall and placed into special measures. There were complaints about the state of the premises. Quality audits carried out by the service had failed to fully identify risks, including a ligature point and the external perimeter fence being easily scalable. Ten incidents of people leaving the service without authorisation had been recorded since May 2019.

In 2022 the Breightmet Centre, which then cared for 17 people with autism, was put into special measures by the Care Quality Commission because "people were not protected from abuse and poor care" and there was a lack of appropriately skilled staff. Complaints had previously been reported of patients being assaulted.

== See also ==
- Private medicine in the United Kingdom
