= International Literature and Psychology Conference =

Psychology Conference

The annual International Literature and Psychology Conference (ILPC), also called the International Conference on Literature and Psychoanalysis or International Conference in Literature-and-Psychology, provides a forum for the exchange of ideas on the psychological study of literature and other arts. The conference welcomes papers that deal with the application of psychology—including psychoanalysis, object relations theory, feminist, Jungian, or Lacanian approaches, cognitive psychology, or neuroscience–to the study of literature, film and visual media, painting, sculpture, music, performance, or the other arts.

Participants come from nations around the world including France, England, Portugal, Spain, Italy, the Netherlands, Germany, Denmark, Finland, Hungary, Serbia, the Czech Republic, Greece, Cyprus, Turkey, Japan, Canada, and the United States of America. The PsyArt Foundation, IPSA (at the University of Florida), along with various other universities, the University of Helsinki, the University of Paris VII and X, the University of Freiburg, the Instituto Superior de Psicologia Applicada in Lisbon, and other institutions, have for a number of years sponsored the annual International Conference in Literature and Psychology. In 2008, the conference was renamed to International Conference on Psychology and the Arts.

== International conference history ==
- 1st: Pècs, Hungary. 1983.
- 2nd: Montpellier, France.
- 3rd: Aix-en-Provence, France.
- 4th: Kent, Ohio, U.S.A.
- 5th: Kirchberg, Austria.
- 6th: Janus Pannonius University. Pècs, Hungary. July, 1989.
- 7th: Centre International de Semiotique et de Linguistique. Urbino, Italy. July, 1990.
- 8th: London, England. July, 1991.
- 9th: Lisbon, Portugal. July, 1992.
- 10th: University of Gröningen. Amsterdam, Holland. June–July, 1993.
- 11th: Sandbjerg, Denmark. June, 1994.
- 12th: Freiburg, Germany.
- 13th: Bentley College. Waltham, Massachusetts, U.S.A. July 2–6, 1996.
- 14th: Avila, Spain. July 2–6, 1997.
- 15th: 1998. St. Petersburg Hotel. St. Petersburg, Russia. July 2–6, 1998.
- 16th: University of Urbino. Urbino, Italy. July 8–12, 1999.
- 17th: Bialystock, Poland. July 6–10, 2000.
- 18th: University of Cyprus. Nicosia. May 15–20, 2001.
- 19th: University of Siena. Arezzo, Italy. June 26 - July 1, 2002.
- 20th: University of Greenwich. London, England. July 2–7, 2003.
- 21st: Arles, France. June 30 - July 5, 2004.
- 22nd: Córdoba, Spain. June 29 - July 4, 2005.
- 23rd: University of Helsinki. Helsinki, Finland. June 28 - July 3, 2006.
- 24th: University of Belgrade. Belgrade, Serbia. July 4–9, 2007.
- 25th: Instituto Superior de Psicologia Aplicada, Lisbon.
- 26th: University of Viterbo. Viterbo, Italy. July 1–6, 2009.
- 27th: University of Pécs. Pécs, Hungary. June 23–28, 2010.
- 28th: Roskilde University, Roskilde, Denmark. June 22–26, 2011.
- 29th: University of Ghent, Ghent Belgium. July 4–8, 2012.
- 30th: University of Porto, Portugal. June 26–30, 2013.
- 31st: Universidad Complutense de Madrid, Spain. June 25–29, 2014.
- 32nd: University of Malta, Msida. June 24–28, 2015.
