= James Frazier (academic administrator) =

Dean of the Florida State University College of Fine Arts

James Frazier is an American dance artist, arts administrator, and Dean of the Florida State University College of Fine Arts.

== Education ==
A native of Florida, Frazier earned his BS in marketing in 1991 and an MFA in dance in 1994 from Florida State University in Tallahassee.

Frazier earned an Ed. D. in Dance from Temple University in 2007, after beginning his studies 10 years prior.

== Dance career ==
During his dance career, Frazier performed and toured with Kokuma Dance Theatre Company, based in England and Dallas Black Dance Theatre. He was also a founding member of Edgeworks Dance Theater. Established in 2001, the Washington, D.C. based dance company was made up of four African American men, led by Helanius J. Wilkins. Edgeworks focused on contemporary dance works that explored the lived experiences of black men in America.

He has worked as a guest or creative collaborator with many others, performing nationally, including engagements at Jacob’s Pillow, the John F. Kennedy Center for the Performing Arts, and Philadelphia’s Prince Music Theater, in the musical St. Louis Woman choreographed by Jawole Willa Jo Zollar, among many others. His own choreography has been presented at numerous universities, but also at Washington DC’s Kennedy Center, The National Museum and the Carter Barron Amphitheater while serving as Associate Artistic Director of the Dance Institute of Washington, under the direction of Fabian Barnes.

He is a past recipient of the Virginia Commission for the Arts Choreographic Fellowship, and in 2009 he was commissioned to create a new ballet for the Richmond Ballet Company.

== Academic career ==
Frazier joined the faculty at Virginia Commonwealth University in 2001. There, he taught jazz dance and modern dance techniques, as well as dance history and theory courses. Frazier’s career at VCU spanned 18 years. He became chair of the Department of Dance and Choreography in 2007, later serving as Associate Dean for Graduate Studies and faculty Affairs and Interim Dean.

In 2010, Frazier was appointed co-dean of the American Dance Festival School alongside Gerri Houlihan, serving in that role through 2013.

Frazier was named the incumbent Dean of the College of Fine Arts at Florida State University in 2018, assuming the role fully in 2019.

Frazier is a former secretary and president of the Council of Dance Administrators (CODA) and a former board member of the American College Dance Association. He is currently president-elect of the International Council of Fine Arts Deans (ICFAD), a multi-national alliance of arts administrators in higher education, where he has served on the organization’s board for several years, including two as secretary.
