= Ohole Shem Association =

- Established: October 8, 1895
- Founder: Herman Rosenthal
- Founded at: New York City, New York

The Ohole Shem Association (Hebrew: אגודת אהלי שם) was an American organization to promote and foster the study of Hebrew and other Semitic languages and to encourage the study of Jewish history and literature.

== History ==
The association was founded in 1895 by Herman Rosenthal, who was assisted in this work by A. Radin, S. Brainin, and others.

The association hosted series of lectures, in Hebrew, German, and English, on subjects relating to Jewish science. In 1895–96 it published a Hebrew monthly entitled Ner ha-Ma'arabi, and in 1901 Ha-Modia' le-Ḥodashim; for 1904 it issued an annual entitled Yalkut Ma'arabi. In 1901, it celebrated the one hundredth anniversary of the birth of Zacharias Frankel, and in 1903 the seventieth birthday of Baron Horace Günzburg. In 1904, it commemorated the twenty-fifth anniversary of the literary activity of the Hebrew poet Menahem Mendel Dolitzky, to whom the first volume of the Yalkut Ma'arabi was dedicated.
