= New Jersey Academy of Science =

Society of scientists in Union, New Jersey

Coordinates: 40.67644°N 74.22850°W

The New Jersey Academy of Science (NJAS) is a private, nonprofit society of scientists and others interested in science, with a membership of about 400 individuals in academia, government, and industry. The academy also includes college students who are pursuing both graduate and undergraduate degrees in the senior academy, as well as high school students in the junior academy.

Founded in 1954, the NJAS is a member of the American Association for the Advancement of Science and of the National Academy of Sciences and works with the New Jersey state government to stimulate education and scientific research throughout the state.

The NJAS is headquartered at Kean University in Union, New Jersey.
