= Opifer =

Psychoanalytic association founded in Italy

OPIFER is a psychoanalytic association founded in Italy on November 4, 1996, now counting about 150 members.

== Philosophy ==
The members follow various orientations, and OPIFER is perhaps the only psychoanalytic association in Europe wherein Freudian, Neo-Freudian, Kleinian, relational, interpersonal, and even Lacanian or Jungian analysts actually coexist and discuss together, all of them aiming at encouraging a pluralistic approach, which welcomes the dialogue among different positions and rejects any dogmatic attitude. The "founding father" of this undertaking was Marco Bacciagaluppi (Milan), who has also been its first President, succeeded by Sergio Dazzi (Parma), Sergio Caruso (Florence), Pietro Andujar (Milan), and Luciana La Stella (Milan).

The name OPIFER is both an acronym (Organizzazione di Psicoanalisti Italiani Federazione e Registro, i.e. Organization of Italian Psychoanalysts Federation and Roster), and a Latin word meaning "he who helps". "Opifer" was in fact the classic appellation of Asclepius, the Greek god of medicine, when he appeared in the dreams of suffering people to bring them relief (Ovidius, Metamorphoseon L. XV: 653). Coherently with this name, OPIFER stresses the therapeutic function of psychoanalysis, as well as the opportuneness to host classic psychoanalysis and all psychoanalytically oriented psychotherapies under the same roof, in constant dialogue with clinical psychology and dynamic psychiatry.

== Related societies ==
The statute is in a way inspired by that of the AAPDP (American Academy of Psychoanalysis and Dynamic Psychiatry), which was founded on the same principles many years before, in 1956. In fact the two Associations keep fraternal relationships, and organize a Joint Meeting "in the footsteps of Silvano Arieti" (the Italo-American famous psychiatrist and psychoanalyst) every year, some of them published. Unlike AAPDP, however, OPIFER is not only an association of individuals: it is also, and mainly works as a federation, i.e. a national association of various associations locally based in different Italian towns, each keeping and maintaining its theoretical orientation and training peculiarities, but all of them willing to cooperate.

The Italian Associations federated with OPIFER (four at the moment when it was founded, in 1996) are now eleven, whereof three have also membership in the IFPS (International Federation of Psychoanalytic Societies). Other scientific societies with which OPIFER has institutional ties of partnership are the "Erich Fromm" International Society, based in Tuebingen, Germany, and the "Silvano Arieti" Foundation, based in Pisa, Italy.
