= Singapore Psychological Society =

- Abbreviation: SPS
- Formation: 11 January 1979
- Type: Society
- Registration no.: S79SS0025E
- Location: Singapore
- Region served: Singapore
- Members: 1,355 (2025)
- President: Adrian Toh
- Vice Presidents: Mok Kai Chuen Nicholas Gabriel Lim,
- Website: singaporepsychologicalsociety.org

The Singapore Psychological Society (SPS) was founded in 1979 by a small group of psychologists, and has since grown to over 1,150 members (2020), about 480 of which are registered psychologists in Singapore.

During the COVID-19 outbreak in Singapore, the SPS offered psychological counselling pro bono or at reduced rates.
