= Women in German =

The Coalition of Women in German, often known as WiG, is a professional organization for women engaged in the field of German studies. The organization was started in 1974. It publishes a newsletter and a yearbook, and has held an annual conference since 1976.

== History ==
The organization has its roots in developments within the German and American women's movements and in growth of women's studies as an area of academic inquiry in the 1970s, developed during informal meetings of feminist Germanists at the annual conventions of the MLA and AATG. The first organizational steps were taken by volunteers from the University of Wisconsin who organized and distributed the organization's first newsletter.

Early concerns of the organization were feminist critiques of teaching materials (German textbooks), feminist pedagogy, and feminist critiques of major authors' works. Textbook critique expanded to include issues of racism, classism, and heterosexism/homophobia in textbooks. The organization has been anti-hierarchical and driven by volunteers since its inception. However, in 1999, the decision was made to have a president, vice-president and steering committee.

The group's name, "Women in German", is intended to be broadly inclusive. "Women" was preferred to "Feminists in German", in order to keep the organization open to all women, whether feminist or not. "German" was favored over "Germanistik", to ensure that the group remains open to the interests of Germanists not currently employed in academia and high school German teachers.

== Newsletter ==
The first newsletter was prepared and distributed by a collective of students and professors at the University of Wisconsin in 1974. The newsletter was based at UW until 1981. During the early years, the newsletter included news about the women's movement in Germany. Now it primarily contains academic information, such as call for papers and conference announcements. Book reviews and bibliographies are also circulated as part of the newsletter. In fall 2003, the group began publishing the newsletter electronically, three times yearly. Back issues from 1975 up to last year's issues on WiG's website, which is listed below.

== Conference ==
The organization has an annual conference for members that was first held in 1976, at Miami University in Oxford, Ohio. The first conference program was called "Feminism and German Studies: An Interdisciplinary Perspective." The original format of the conference involved unstructured discussion periods on two broad topics before and after a more traditional academic symposium, at which conference attendees presented papers. After 1977, the traditional symposium was abandoned in favor of "Arbeitsgruppen" [trans. "work groups"] to "encourage greater involvement on the part of all participants and to eliminate the typical split between 'active' papergivers and a 'passive' audience." The goal of collective work remains important, however the growing size of the conference has caused changes in the format. Since 1980, women German-language authors have been invited to each conference.

Currently, the conference is a 3-day event consisting of panel talks. There is still some time allotted at every conference for open discussion.

Two awards honoring scholarly achievement in German Studies are presented each year at the conference: the Dissertation Prize and the Best Article Prize. Women in German also promotes members' work annually by supporting stipends for graduate student travel, professional development, and faculty research.

== Yearbook ==
The Women in German Yearbook was started in 1985 as a "response to the growing interest in Women's Studies in German literature and culture." It is a peer-reviewed academic journal that is published once yearly. Currently, it is published at the University of Nebraska Press.

For many years, there has been discussion about replacing the Yearbook with or transforming it into a biannual or quarterly publication. This idea has not yet been realized, as it has been financially out of reach for the organization.

The rising cost of the print publication and an increase in interest in electronic scholarship in recent years, has prompted the organization to consider transitioning to an online journal in place of the print Yearbook.

== Interorganizational alliances ==
Women in German has been an "allied organization" of the MLA since 1976. The organization has held meetings or presentations at both the MLA and AATG conventions nearly every year since its inception. Women in German did not plan sessions at the AATG convention during years in which the convention was held in a state that had not ratified the ERA.

== Web presence ==
Women in German has had a website since the mid-nineties. The site was initially created and hosted at the University of Massachusetts Amherst. Since 2002, the organization has had its own domain name and webspace. A group of members at the University of California, Berkeley set up a WIG-L listserv. The WiG newsletter, as mentioned above, has been electronic since 203.
