= Jungian Society for Scholarly Studies =

North American interdisciplinary organization

- Formation: 2002
- President: Evija Volfa Vestergaard
- Website: www.jungiansociety.org

The Jungian Society for Scholarly Studies is a North American interdisciplinary organization of scholars interested in developing, extending and applying the theories of Carl Gustav Jung to natural sciences, social sciences, humanities, and the arts.

== Publications ==
The society publishes the Journal of Jungian Scholarly Studies, an annual peer-reviewed open access academic journal established in 2005 as the Jungian Journal of Scholarly Studies. The journal is published by the University of Alberta Libraries and contains scholarly articles on a wide range of subjects related to Jungian theory.

Each volume reflects the theme of the annual conference of the Jungian Society for Scholarly Studies.

== Conferences ==
The society organizes an annual meeting where original papers, roundtable discussions, and workshops are presented.
