= International Society for Arabic Papyrology =

The International Society for Arabic Papyrology is a scholarly society for the study of Arabic papyri. It was founded in March 2002 in Cairo and is currently based at Princeton University. The society publishes a newsletter, al-Bardiyyat.
