= Euler Society =

American group dedicated to the life and work of Leonhard Euler

The Euler Society is an American group that is dedicated to the examination of the life and work of Leonhard Euler. Its first meeting was August 2002, organized after several enthusiasts met at the 2001 Joint Mathematics Meeting.

== About the Euler Society ==
The Euler Society was founded in 2001. The mission of the Euler Society is to encourage academic contributions that study the life, work, and influence of Leonhard Euler. Along with examining Euler, the Euler Society also explores current mathematical topics that build upon his work. In addition, the society engages in the study of the Enlightenment, which was an intellectual movement of 18th century Europe. These mathematical topics include applications to mechanics, astronomy, and technology.

== The Executive Board ==
The society contains the normal board positions of president, vice-president, secretary, and treasurer. These executive board members uphold the usual duties of their stations. Two additional titles are included in the society: chancellor and ombudsman. The chancellor is the head administrator of the society while the ombudsman is in charge of scheduling travel and handling legal matters.

== Activities ==
The committee holds annual conferences. The first conference was held in 2002 in Rumford, Maine. Since the first meeting the Euler Society has held their conferences in different areas of the Northeast and Midwest United States. Since 2012 the Euler Society has alternated hosting the conferences with the MAA MathFest in odd numbered years and independently in even numbered years. The conferences that they do independently often are held in late July and are for all levels of mathematicians. Usually these conferences have an average of attendees between 20 and 30 people. The subjects addressed are not limited to just Euler’s life and works. The topics include mathematical topics Euler’s colleagues and contemporaries worked on, the academic and political life in the 18th century and historical trends that influence the sciences and mathematics during that time. The people who present at these independent conferences have a choice to give a 20 minute or 50 minute presentation. The presentation is followed by 5–10 minutes for questioning. The conferences that are done with the MAA Fest give an opportunity for scholars to present their current and past work to people who have similar interests. These conferences are often held in early August. Both the independent and joint conferences give people the opportunity to read original sources such as Euler’s work in Latin or French, the most common original languages the works are written in. People are also able to see the early development of many mathematical and scientific ideas. The past meetings have been held in Washington, D.C. in 2015, Austin, TX in 2014, Hartford, CT in 2013, Garden City, NY in 2012, and Kenosha, WI in 2011.

They also inspired and assisted with the creation of an online database, the Euler Archive, of all of Euler's works.

== Membership ==
In order to join and become and full member of the society one must fill out a membership application and submit an application fee. Other payments to the society are voluntary, but the society encourages the donations. Honorary members can be added; this is at the discretion of the executive board.
