= Council of State Neurosurgical Societies =

Surgical society

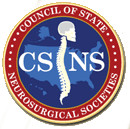
- Founded: 1973
- Chairman: Luis Tumialan, MD
- Website: www.csnsonline.org

The Council of State Neurosurgical Societies is a professional body and an American surgical society created in 1976 to provide a national forum for the State Neurosurgical Societies of the United States of America. As a forum for practicing neurosurgeons, it focuses primarily on discussion, consideration, and proposals of action regarding socioeconomic issues concerning neurological surgery. The CSNS is composed of active neurosurgeons which are members of the various state neurosurgical societies in the ratio of 1 representative per 50 state society neurosurgeon members. The Presidents of the AANS and CNS appoint members/delegates to the CSNS in addition to the state designated delegates and 13 neurosurgery residents are elected as delegates from the four Quadrants with one selected from the Armed Services. The Council meets twice a year just before the annual meetings of the AANS and the CNS during which it considers resolutions submitted by delegates or its committees and receives reports from those committees as well as the AANS and CNS. Resolutions that are adopted by assembly vote are sent to the AANS/CNS for consideration and potential implementation.

== History of the Council of State Neurosurgical Societies ==
After the creation and recognition of neurological surgery as a distinct medical specialty regional, national and international neurosurgical societies were formed predominantly in the first half of the 20th century to disseminate advances in neurological surgery and to promote research. With the expansion of third party payers and the advent of Medicare in the 1960s, socio-economic issues began to impinge on the practice of neurosurgery and the Congress of Neurological Surgeons (CNS) established a Socio-Economics Committee in 1963 under the Chairmanship of the late Dr. William Mosberg. A group of neurosurgeons met in 1973 and chose to name itself the National Advisory Group. At this first meeting, the attendees divided themselves into four regions: the Northeast, Northwest, Southeast and Southwest. This was primarily done to facilitate information transfer and regionally assist each other in the formation of state societies. The National Advisory Group was under the umbrella of the Joint Socio-Economics Committee and reported to this committee. The National Advisory Group would meet during the JSEC meeting twice each year and when JSEC decided to have its meetings just before rather than during the AANS and CNS annual meetings in 1974, it moved to that time slot as well. The National Advisory Group initially had its membership appointed by JSEC but as it evolved, each state society began to send representatives to the National Advisory Group meetings as essentially elected delegates. The National Advisory Group changed its name to the Council of State Neurosurgical Societies (CSNS) in 1976 and formalized the elected state delegate concept. JSEC appointed Edwin Amyes the first Chairman of the CSNS in 1977 and the CSNS held its first formal meeting in 1978. In 1986, the organizational structure was streamlined to create the Council of State Neurosurgical Societies, with a single set of officers and its own membership. Throughout its history, the organization has served as an educational resource and repository of socioeconomic expertise.

== Organization ==
The CSNS functions through a number of standing and ad-hoc committees. Committees include:

Communication & Education
Coding and Reimbursement
Medical Practices
Medico-Legal
Neurotrauma and Emergency Neurosurgery
Reimbursement
Workforce
Young Neurosurgeons Section

== Key efforts ==
The Council of State Neurosurgical Societies is concerned with a number of socioeconomic issues including:

- Medical Malpractice Reform
- Medicare Reimbursement
- Pay-for-Performance Issues
- EMTALA and Neurotrauma-care related Issues
- Patient Safety Issues
- Leadership development

== Socio-economic Fellowship ==
The CSNS members elect a Chairperson and officers from its members, the chair serves for a 1-year term. Past and current Chairpersons of the CSNS are:

- 1977–1980 Edwin Amyes, MD
- 1980–1983 Donald Stewart, MD
- 1983–1985 Louis Finney, MD
- 1985–1989 Paul Croissant, MD
- 1989–1992 Russell Travis, MD
- 1992–1994 Donald Sheffel, MD
- 1994–1997 Stanley Pelofsky, MD
- 1997–1999 James Bean, MD
- 1999–2001 Lyal Leibrock, MD
- 2001–2003 David Jimenez, MD
- 2003–2005 Frederick Boop, MD
- 2005–2007 Fernando Diaz, MD
- 2007–2009 Gary Bloomgarden, MD
- 2009–2011 William Bingaman, MD
- 2011–2013 Deborah Benzil, MD
- 2013-2015 Mark Linskey, MD
- 2015-2017 Anne Stroink, MD
- 2017–2019 Josh Rosenow, MD
- 2019-2021 Michael Steinmetz, MD
- 2021- 2023 Joe Cheng, MD
- 2023- 2025 John Ratliff, MD
- 2025- Present Luis Tumialan, MD
