= American Society of Papyrologists =

The American Society of Papyrologists was established in 1961 to further the study of ancient Greek and Latin papyri and of the materials contained in them. The society publishes a journal, The Bulletin of the American Society of Papyrologists. The president for 2015-17 is Jennifer Sheridan Moss of Wayne State University.
