= Chronic limb threatening ischemia =

Severe form of peripheral artery disease

- Other names: Critical limb ischemia, limb threat

Chronic limb-threatening ischemia (CLTI), formerly known as critical limb ischemia (CLI), is a severe manifestation of peripheral artery disease that results in significantly reduced blood flow to the lower extremities, leading to ischemic rest pain, non-healing ulcers, or gangrene. It represents the end stage of peripheral artery disease and is associated with a high risk of limb loss and mortality if left untreated. The condition arises due to progressive atherosclerosis, which leads to arterial narrowing or occlusion, impairing circulation and tissue perfusion.

Chronic limb-threatening ischemia is diagnosed based on clinical symptoms and objective measures of perfusion, including the ankle-brachial index, toe-brachial index, transcutaneous oxygen pressure, or skin perfusion pressure. Imaging techniques such as angiography, fluorescence imaging, and subcutaneous oxygen biosensors, are emerging tools for assessment and treatment planning.

Management of chronic limb-threatening ischemia involves risk factor modification, including smoking cessation, lipid-lowering therapy, and glycemic control, alongside pharmacologic interventions such as antiplatelet therapy and antihypertensives. Exercise therapy plays a role in improving collateral circulation, while endovascular or surgical revascularization is often required to restore adequate blood flow and prevent amputation in advanced cases.

Given its high morbidity and mortality rates, early recognition and a multidisciplinary approach are essential for optimizing patient outcomes.

== Signs and symptoms ==
Critical limb ischemia includes rest pain and tissue loss.

=== Rest pain ===
Rest pain is a continuous burning pain of the lower leg or feet. It begins, or is aggravated, after reclining or elevating the limb and is relieved by sitting or standing. It is more severe than intermittent claudication, which is also a pain in the legs from arterial insufficiency.

=== Tissue loss ===
Tissue loss is the development of arterial insufficiency ulcers or gangrene due to peripheral artery disease.

== Pathophysiology ==
Chronic limb threatening ischemia is defined by Conte, et al as "a clinical syndrome defined by the presence of peripheral artery disease in combination with rest pain, gangrene, or a lower limb ulceration >2 weeks duration." More simply put, chronic limb-threatening ischemia is a serious condition where poor blood flow due to blocked arteries causes severe pain, open sores, or even tissue death (gangrene) in the legs or feet. It is diagnosed when a wound on the lower limb doesn't heal for more than two weeks or when a person experiences constant pain, even at rest.

=== Peripheral arterial disease ===
Peripheral artery disease commonly affects the abdominal aorta, iliac, and femoral arteries, often resulting from atherosclerosis. This condition arises from complex interactions involving cholesterol and vascular cells. Plaque gradually builds up inside the arteries, and while they initially widen to maintain blood flow, this mechanism eventually fails, leading to narrowing of the vessel.

As this narrowing worsens or arteries become blocked, smaller vessels form to reroute blood flow. While these collateral vessels help maintain some circulation, they cannot match the original artery's capacity. As a result, when muscles require more oxygen during activities like walking, the limited blood supply can't keep up. This causes muscle pain, cramps, or fatigue, which ease once the person stops moving and oxygen demand decreases.

Most individuals experience symptoms only during exertion, but in severe cases, blood flow may become inadequate even at rest. This can lead to persistent burning pain in the feet, slow-healing wounds, or ulcers. In extreme cases, tissue death may occur, causing parts of the foot or toes to blacken and develop gangrene.

=== Ulcer/Wound development ===
Foot ulcers develop due to a combination of factors, including poor circulation (vascular disease), nerve damage (neuropathy), structural foot deformities, and soft tissue changes. Blood vessel issues involve both large (macrovascular) and small (microvascular) vessels, with conditions like peripheral artery disease increasing the risk. Peripheral artery disease leads to narrowed arteries, reducing blood flow and making ulcers harder to heal.

Diabetes contributes to this problem by increasing blood clotting and restricting blood vessels, which limits oxygen and nutrients needed for healing. It also damages small blood vessels, reducing their ability to regulate blood flow. A key issue is the loss of nitric oxide, which helps keep vessels open—without it, vessels constrict, worsening circulation.

Neuropathy, or nerve damage, leads to loss of sensation, making it difficult for patients to notice injuries. It also causes muscle imbalance, leading to excess pressure in certain foot areas and increasing the risk of tissue breakdown. Autonomic nerve damage reduces blood supply to the skin, worsening healing. Foot deformities, such as bunions, hammertoes, or Charcot foot, can create pressure points, further contributing to ulcer formation. Additionally, loss of soft tissue padding in the foot makes the skin more vulnerable to damage.

== Diagnosis ==
Critical limb ischemia is diagnosed by the presence of ischemic rest pain, and an ulcers that will not heal or gangrene due to insufficient blood flow. Insufficient blood flow may be confirmed by ankle-brachial index (ABI), ankle pressure, toe-brachial index (TBI), toe systolic pressure, transcutaneous oxygen measurement, or skin perfusion pressure.

Other factors which may point to a diagnosis of critical limb ischemia are a Buerger's angle of less than 20 degrees during Buerger's test, a capillary refill of more than 15 seconds or diminished or absent pulses.

Critical limb ischemia is different from acute limb ischemia. Acute limb ischemia is a sudden lack of blood flow to the limb, for example caused by an embolus whereas critical limb ischemia is a late sign of a progressive chronic disease.

=== Emerging Diagnostic Approaches ===
Other diagnostic approaches for critical limb ischemia under development or that have recently been introduced include different angiographic and imaging techniques, as well as the use of biosensors.

2D perfusion imaging is a software analysis package that can be incorporated into a standard angiogram, that allows measurement of parameters of contrast delivery to a region of interest in the foot.

Fluorescence angiography enables the visualization of regional blood flow using a charge-coupled camera. A 2016 study determined that it "is a valuable tool in visualizing real-time procedural outcomes and providing additionally useful information on regional tissue perfusion."

Biosensors measuring oxygen levels subcutaneously in the feet of patients with critical limb ischemia have been developed. Initial studies show these sensors may have value in predicting wound healing. One such sensing system, known as Lumee Oxygen, manufactured by Profusa Inc, attained European Regulatory approval in 2020.

== Treatment ==
Treatment of chronic limb threatening ischemia is similar to that of peripheral arterial disease and is broken down into decreasing cardiovascular risk and treating symptoms. Cardiovascular risks of heart attack (myocardial infarction), stroke, and all cause mortality are increased in patients with peripheral arterial disease; therefore, addressing risk factors like reducing cholesterol (with a moderate to high intensity statin), controlling blood pressure, controlling diabetes, and quitting smoking are key interventions.

=== Medical management ===
1. Smoking: Patients should work with a physician to use counseling, pharmacotherapy, and/ or behavioral therapy to reduce and/or quit smoking. There is strong evidence for physicians to even ask patients who used to smoke to continue asking smoking status at subsequent visits.
2. Statin therapy: Statins have been proven to lower the risk of heart-related complications, improve overall survival, and decrease the need for procedures to restore blood flow.
3. Control of blood sugar: stringent goal of hemoglobin A1C <7%
4. High blood pressure: A goal of blood pressure <140/90 is not evidence based, but is generally considered the target goal for patients with chronic limb-threatening ischemia. ACE-inhibitors, calcium-channel blockers, and diuretics are common first line agents to reach this blood pressure goal.
5. Anti-platelet therapy: Clopidogrel is a relatively cheap and potent blood thinner with expert consensus as therapy for chronic limb-threatening ischemia. It has shown to reduce risk of stroke, heart attack, vascular death in patients with peripheral arterial disease. In patients with re-vascularization, dual-anti platelet therapy is commonly used.

==== Exercise therapy ====
Supervised exercise programs have evidence in improving claudication symptoms in patients with peripheral artery disease. Because walking increases the energy needs of the legs, walking until patients have pain, resting until the pain subsides, and continuing walking with repetition increases collateral blood flow, or blood flow from other, smaller vessels, helps increase blood flow to the legs. This is how exercise programs can improve symptoms in patients.

==== Intermittent claudication pharmacotherapy ====
Medication may be an option for managing intermittent claudication in patients who do not improve with exercise or lifestyle changes. Two approved drugs for IC treatment are cilostazol and naftidrofuryl. Cilostazol helps widen blood vessels, prevent blood clots, and slow muscle cell growth. Studies have shown it can significantly improve walking distance without pain. Naftidrofuryl works differently by affecting energy production in cells and has fewer side effects than cilostazol, making it a good alternative when available.

=== Surgical or endovascular treatments ===
If a patient's symptoms are severe and do not improve with lifestyle changes, exercise, or medication, they may need a procedure to restore blood flow. This can be done through minimally invasive techniques, surgery, or a combination of both. Treatment is recommended for those whose leg pain makes daily activities difficult or who have serious circulation problems, such as constant pain, open wounds, or tissue death (gangrene).

The choice between surgery and a less invasive procedure depends on several factors, including the patient's overall health, the severity and location of the blockages, the doctor's expertise, and the patient's preference. A team of specialists, including a primary care doctor, an interventional specialist, and a vascular surgeon, should work together to create the best treatment plan for each patient.

== Research ==
As of 2015 pCMV-vegf165, a gene-therapy was being studied in critical limb ischemia. In 2014, a trial was started to better understand the best revascularization technique for critical limb ischemia. As of 2017, it had enrolled nearly half of the 2100 people needed to complete the trial. A similar study, BASIL 2 (Bypass Versus Angio plasty in Severe Ischaemia of the Leg), is being conducted in the United Kingdom.
