= Cardiovascular examination =

Medical evaluation of the cardiovascular system

- Purpose: evaluation of the cardiovascular system.

The cardiovascular examination is a portion of the physical examination that involves evaluation of the cardiovascular system. The exact contents of the examination will vary depending on the presenting complaint but a complete examination will involve the heart (cardiac examination), lungs (pulmonary examination), belly (abdominal examination) and the blood vessels (peripheral vascular examination).

The cardiac examination is based on the different methods of evaluation, comprising the following sections: measurement of vital signs; inspection and palpation, percussion and auscultation, pulmonary examination, abdominal examination and peripheral vascular examination. The evaluation of a real patient will require switching between the different methods and even different organs to save time and keep the patient comfortable: for example, listening to the heart and the lungs of a young child before they get bored. The only materials needed are a sphygmomanometer (blood pressure cuff), a stethoscope and the use of sight, touch, smell and sound.

== Measurement of Vital Signs ==
- A good cardiac examination starts as soon you can lay eyes on the patient. Doctors will observe the color of skin, rate of breathing, and emotional state of their patients at a distance before the examination begins. An accurate blood pressure and heart rate should be measured, as these are direct measurements of how well the heart is working. An automatic blood pressure cuff can be used, but a healthcare professional can also use a manual blood pressure cuff and stethoscope. The bell of the stethoscope should be placed over the brachial artery when taking a blood pressure manually: the pressure meter when the first two heart beats are heard will show the systolic blood pressure; when the sounds disappear, the meter will show the diastolic blood pressure. A normal systolic blood pressure will be less than 120 mm Hg, and a normal diastolic blood pressure will be less than 80 mm Hg. A blood pressure that is more than 15 mm Hg different between the right and left arm may indicate a problem with the patient's blood vessels.
- A normal heart rate is between 60 and 100 beats per minute. This can be measured wherever a pulse can be felt, but is usually measured from the radial artery. Vital signs should be measured at least twice during each patient encounter, with as much time as possible between measurements (e.g. once at the beginning and once at the end of the appointment). A heart rate and rhythm that is normal may be written down as "RRR".

== Cardiac examination ==
The cardiac examination (also known as the precordial exam), involves examination of a person for signs of diseases of the heart. The chest is the main area that will be examined, but other areas that will be examined include the hands, head and ankles.

=== Inspection and Palpation ===
- The cardiac examination may continue with the patient resting comfortably, just as before. Before moving any drapes, the patient should be asked if it is okay to move them. If they say yes, then the patient's shirt, pants or gown should be removed and the drape should be lowered to the bottom of the lowest rib so that the doctor can see the whole chest. Inspecting (looking at) the patient closely can show movements of the ventricles or the point of maximal impulse (PMI). Certain conditions can be identified upon inspection.
- Touching the patient (also known as palpation) can help identify heaves and lifts (a feeling of the chest wall pushing outward), thrills (a feeling of the chest wall vibrating, usually with loud murmurs), impulses (a feeling the heart makes when it presses against the chest wall) and the first (S1) and second (S2) heart sound (the sounds of rushing blood that correlate with different phases of the heart beat).
- The doctor can then ask the patient to relax while the back of the examination table is raised to a 30-45˚ angle. From this position, the jugular venous pressure (JVP) can be estimated. Because the right internal jugular vein flows directly into the superior vena cava and then the right atrium, it is a good estimate of central venous pressure. JVP can be assessed by measuring how far the highest point of pulsation (of the right internal jugular vein) is above the sternal angle (the joint between the manubrium and the sternum). Any height greater than 3 cm is considered elevated. When the patient is reclining, it is also easier to palpate the PMI. By asking the patient to lean to their left (left lateral decubitis position), the PMI can become even more noticeable. Be aware that in certain diseases (such as right ventricular hypertrophy) the PMI may not always correlate with the apical impulse, in which case it is called a displaced PMI. Depending on the presentation of the patient, heaves, lifts, thrills, impulses and heart sounds may be detected better when they are reclining, sitting or even leaning forward.

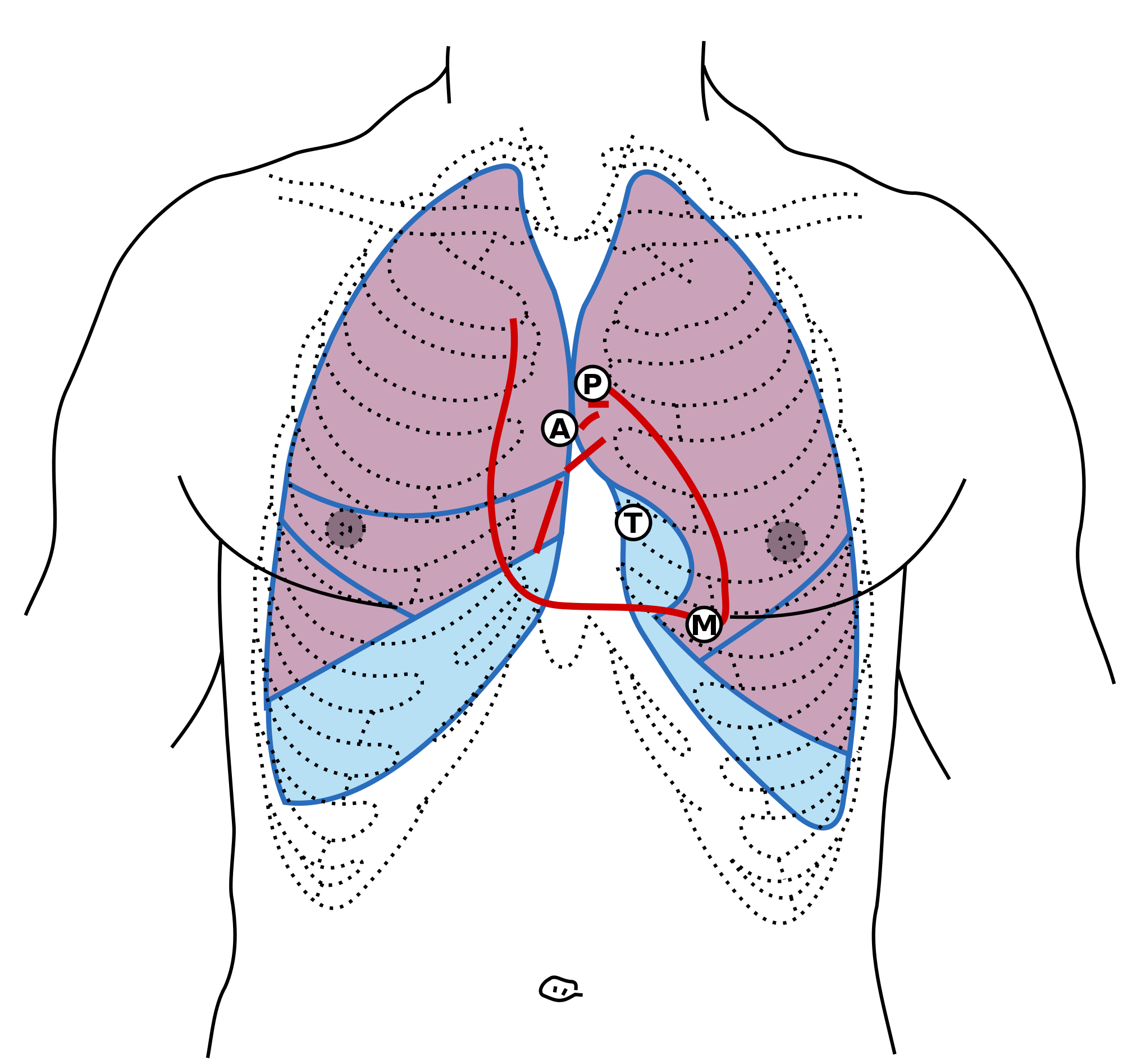
Location of Heart Sounds for Auscultation

=== Percussion and Auscultation ===
- For the best cardiac examination, it is important to have the patient both sit up and lay down at a 30-45˚ angle. Tapping with the fingertips (also known as percussion) can be used to estimate the size of the heart, though palpation is more accurate. From the left side of the chest, the doctor can tap the spaces between the ribs with the tips of their middle finger to listen for the dullness that will be present over the heart. Listening with a stethoscope (also known as auscultation) to all four areas of the heart: aortic, pulmonic, tricuspid and mitral. Any murmurs, rubs or gallops should be noted. Gallops are also known as a third (S3) or fourth (S4) heart sound. The absence of abnormalities (normal) may be recorded as "no m/r/g". The ACC and the AHA have called cardiac auscultation "the most widely used method of screening for valvular heart disease." Because of its importance to the cardiac examination, cardiac auscultation has been covered in-depth elsewhere.

== Pulmonary Examination ==
- A customized pulmonary examination can also help diagnose a cardiac disease, such as in the auscultation of certain lung sounds or pleural effusions (e.g., in the case of heart failure). An unusual sound that comes from the pulmonary examination can point to a disease of the heart. Inspection, palpation, percussion and auscultation of the lungs are all important for the cardiac examination. The specifics of pulmonary examination can be covered elsewhere.

== Abdominal Examination ==
- The cardiovascular system includes many big vessels that carry blood into and beyond the belly (abdominal cavity). The largest blood vessel in the body, the aorta, should be palpated and auscultated over the belly for any thrills or bruits. Draping will be important here, so that the belly is exposed but the chest and hips are covered. The renal arteries, which branch off at the same level of the 1st or 2nd lumbar vertebra, should be examined for thrills or bruits as well. Edema can be caused by many different conditions, and can be found in the abdominal cavity by testing for a fluid wave and/or shifting dullness. These maneuvers have been covered in the abdominal examination section.

== Peripheral Examination ==
- From head to toe, there are several places in the body where arterial pulses can be felt for their strength and quality. Many arteries that are on both sides of the body (bilateral) may be palpated at the same time for the sake of comparison, except for the carotid arteries; deep palpation of both carotid arteries can cut off blood flow to the brain. The carotid arteries, should be auscultated to listen for bruits, as this can indicate the buildup of plaque inside of the vessel (also known as atherosclerosis). The brachial arteries may be palpated underneath the biceps tendon. The radial pulses can be found on the forearm, above the wrists. Femoral pulses can be palpated below the inguinal ligament, about halfway between the pubic symphysis and the anterior superior iliac spine. The popliteal arteries are harder to palpate, but can be found by pressing deeply with the knee slightly bent. If the femoral pulse is strong, but the popliteal pulse is weak, this can indicate atherosclerosis of the vessels in the thigh. Finally, the posterior tibial and dorsalis pedis arteries provide a good indicator of circulation to the extremities. These can be palpated just behind the ankle and on the top of the foot, respectively.
- The extremities of the patient should be observed for the presence of edema (swelling, usually due to fluid collection). Pitting edema, where pressing the skin may leave indentation, suggests that intravascular fluid has leaked into the interstitial tissues. Nonpitting edema is more likely to be caused by a blockage in the lymphatic or circulatory systems.
- The ankle-brachial pressure index compares the systolic blood pressure of the ankle to the systolic blood pressure of the arm. A ratio that is outside of the range of 1-1.3 may indicate a disease of the vessels, such as peripheral arterial disease (the ankle-brachial index would be low).
