= Skin perfusion pressure =

SPP probes placed on the plantar

Skin perfusion pressure (SPP) is a diagnostic exam for assessing blood pressure in the microcirculatory system. It emerged as a clinical protocol in the 1960s. Since then, advances in technology have transformed SPP from a complex and invasive procedure to the noninvasive exam it is today.

SPP values are primarily used as an aid in wound-healing prognosis — especially diabetic foot ulcers (DFUs). SPP values taken before and after revascularization help clinicians assess the effectiveness of surgery.

Measurement techniques have evolved over time, but today, laser Doppler — which assesses the movement of red blood cells in the capillaries and small arteries — has become the most widely used technology for measuring SPP.

== SPP in practice ==
SPP can be measured at multiple sites: on the foot (plantar, dorsal, and toes), on the ankle, and above and below the knee. Blood ﬂow is occluded by placing a pressure cuff over an SPP probe and inﬂating it above the patient’s resting systolic pressure. The cuff is then gradually deﬂated until microcirculatory ﬂow returns — this is the SPP value and is measured in millimeters of mercury (mmHg).

== Application of skin perfusion pressure ==
To determine the best course of treatment and address the complexity posed by individuals with diseases like diabetes and peripheral artery disease (PAD), modern guidelines include recommendations for multiple macro- and microcirculation measurements. In isolation, ankle-brachial index (ABI), for example, is not a reliable measurement for patients with diabetes, as they are misleading in up to 50% of cases.

For vascular diseases, toe pressure, skin perfusion pressure (SPP), and transcutaneous oxygen pressure (TcpO2) are among the exams recommended for diagnosis, prognosis, treatment, and follow-up. Both SPP and TcpO2 can support the assessment of patients whose ankles are non-compressible or whose toes have been amputated.

While both protocols provide insight into the status of a person’s microcirculatory system, the condition of the patient usually guides the choice of exam.

== Interpreting SPP results ==
The 2023 update of the IWGDF guidelines, includes SPP values for wound-healing prognosis, stating that values ≥ 40 mmHg can increase the probability of healing by up to 30%. The main advantage of SPP is that it is not affected by vascular calcification or anatomical structure.
