= Ashok Seth =

Indian interventional cardiologist

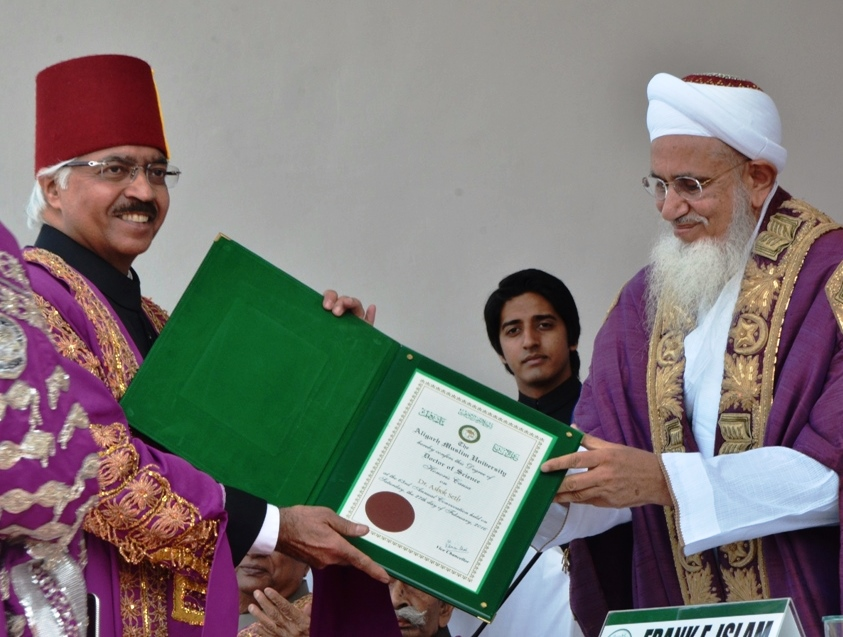
- Ashok Seth during 63rd Annual Convocation in Aligarh Muslim University
- Born: 25 October 1954 (age 71); India
- Education: Jawaharlal Nehru Medical College, Aligarh
- Occupation: Cardiologist
- Known for: Interventional cardiology
- Awards: Padma Bhushan; Order of Isabella the Catholic; Padma Shri; IMA Distinguished Service Award; Shresth Shree Award; All India Khatri Mahasabha AwardAndreas Gruentzig Award; IBC 20th Century Award; NICCSI Professional Excellence Award; Delhi Ratna Award; IMA Distinguished Interventional Cardiologist Award; Rotary Vocational Excellence Award; IJCP Interventional Cardiologist of the Year; IMA NDB Life Time Achievement Award; DMA Medical Teachers' Award; World Heart Federation Citation; DMA Legend in Interventional Cardiology Award; WCCPC2006 Life Time Achievement Award; GSI Lifetime Achievement Award; Cardiological Society of India Citation; IMA-NDB Distinguished Service Award; IMA Doctor’s Day Award; IMA Magnanimous Award; WCCPC Lifetime Achievement Award; WCCPGC-2008 Lifetime Achievement Award; MIDI Management Excellence Award; Sunday Indian and IIPM Mega Excellence Award; WCCPGC-2009 Lifetime Achievement Award; IMA Dr. K. Sharan Cardiology Excellence Award; Mason Sones Award; Atma Jyoti Award; AACIO Special Award; Golden Pioneer of Interventional Cardiology Award; Rotary Lifetime Achievement Award; Vishisht Bihari Samman; Vishisht Chikitsa Ratan; JNMC Most Glorious Alumni; Doc N Doc-Gammex Saviour Award; DMA Centenary Award; Hero Lifetime Achievement Award

Ashok Seth (born 25 October 1954) is an Indian interventional cardiologist, credited with the performance of over 50,000 angiograms and 20,000 angioplasties, which has been included in the Limca Book of Records, a book for achievements and records from an Indian perspective. He is a Fellow of the Royal Colleges of Physicians of London, Edinburgh and Ireland and serves as the chief cardiologist, holding the chairs of the department of cardiovascular sciences and cardiology council at the Fortis Healthcare. Seth, a recipient of the Order of Isabella the Catholic, was honored by the Government of India with the fourth highest Indian civilian award of Padma Shri, in 2003, followed by Padma Bhushan, the third highest Indian civilian award, in 2015.

== Biography ==
Ashok Seth graduated in Medicine (MBBS) from the Jawaharlal Nehru Medical College, Aligarh Muslim University in 1978. Later, moving to UK for higher education, he served as a cardiologist at the Queen Elizabeth Hospital of Birmingham University until 1988. During this period, he did advanced training to secure membership of the Royal College of Physicians of London (MRCP) in 1984 and the Royal College of Physicians of Ireland (MRCP) in 1986. He returned to India in 1988 and joined the Escorts Heart Institute, New Delhi, present day Fortis Healthcare, as its Chief of Invasive and Interventional Cardiology and established the Invasive Cardiology programme at the institution. He stayed with Fortis Healthcare until 2004 after which he moved to Max Healthcare, erstwhile Max Heart and Vascular Institute. He has also been serving as an honorary professor of cardiology at several other institutions such as Gandhi Medical College, Bhopal (since 2000), Raipur Medical College (since 2001), Bilaspur Medical College (since 2001), D. Y. Patil University (since 2008) and Bangladesh Medical College, Dhaka (since 1998). After four years at Max, he returned to Fortis Healthcare to resume his duties there as the chief cardiologist and the chairman of its Cardiac Sciences Division.

== Professional associations ==
Ashok Seth is a member of Asian Pacific Society of interventional Cardiology (APSIC) Board of Trustees and SCAI Nominating Committee and sits on the advisory boards of ACC India, SCAI Interventional Fellows Institute (IFI), International Andreas Gruentzig Society (IAGS), E-Cypher, USA, Asia-Pacific Society of Interventional Cardiology (Singapore) and ERA Educational Trust and Medical College, Lucknow. He holds the chair of the Indian chapter of the Organization of International Medical Video Interventional Program (IMVIP) and is the co-chairman of SCAI International Committee. He is a voting selector of SCAI (MSCAI) Nominating Committee, Zonal vice president of Asian Pacific Society of Cardiology, associate director of TCT Scientific Sessions and the president of the Delhi branch of the Cardiological Society of India. He is a founding member of Endovascular Intervention Society of India, Academy of TCT, New York and the SAARC Cardiac Society for Research, Training and Exchange of Expertise in Prevention and Treatment of Heart Disease in Asia. He is a trustee of Indo-French Cardiovascular Foundation for Research, Education and Training in the field of Angioplasty and a former trustee of Society of Cardiovascular Angiography and Interventions, USA. He has also served as the vice president of the Cardiological Society of India and as the chairman of the New Delhi branch of Indian Medical Association.

On 18 July 2019, Ashok Seth appointed as President of Asia Pacific Society of Interventional Cardiology.

== Legacy ==
Ashok Seth is credited with pioneering many cardiological techniques in the Asia Pacific region. He is the first cardiologist in the region to perform an angioscopy and directional atherectomy. He is reported to be the first to use Impella heart support device and Drug-eluting stents, Bioresorbable stents and thrombectomy devices in India. He is known to have contributed to the development of Bioresorbable Scaffold (BRS) Stent as a member of the Advisory Group. The youngest person to receive a doctoral degree (Honoris Causa) from the Banares Hindu University, Seth's tally of angioplasty and angiogram performances is noted by the Limca Book of Records as one of the highest in the world. He is known to perform Percutaneous Myocardial Laser Revascularization, reported to be among the few cardiologists in the World to perform the procedure.

Seth, who is reported to have contributed to reaching the treatment to the poor, is known to have involved in many research activities. His researches are documented by way of over 250 medical papers published in peer reviewed national and international journals. He has contributed chapters to 10 text books and has edited two text books on cardiology. He has also trained over 350 cardiologists in India and abroad and has performed demonstrations on advanced angioplasty techniques at over 400 international conferences and seminars in Singapore, Malaysia, Paris, China, Australia, Korea and Sri Lanka. His live demonstrations have been transmitted via satellite during the Transcatheter Cardiovascular Therapeutics conference in 2003 and 2007 and at the EuroPCR in 2003 and 2006.

Ashok Seth is involved with many scientific journals. He is a former Associate Editor of International Journal of Cardiology and sits on the editorial boards of Journal American College of Cardiology, Catheterization and Cardiovascular Intervention and Euro Intervention journals. Seth is the first Asian to be elected to the Board of Governors of Society of the Cardiac Angiographies and Intervention (USA). He has been a member of the expert committee set up by the society for formulating the guidelines laid down by its position statement, Percutaneous Coronary Interventions Without On-Site Surgical Backup. He is a member of the expert committee of the Directorate General of Health Services under its Central Drugs Standard Control Organization. He also serves as the chief coordinator of the Council for Scientific and Industrial Research initiative, the NTMLI project for the indigenous manufacture of low cost drug-eluting stents within the country.

== Awards and recognitions ==
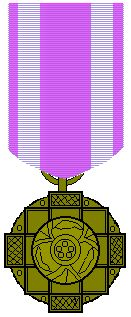
Padma Shri India

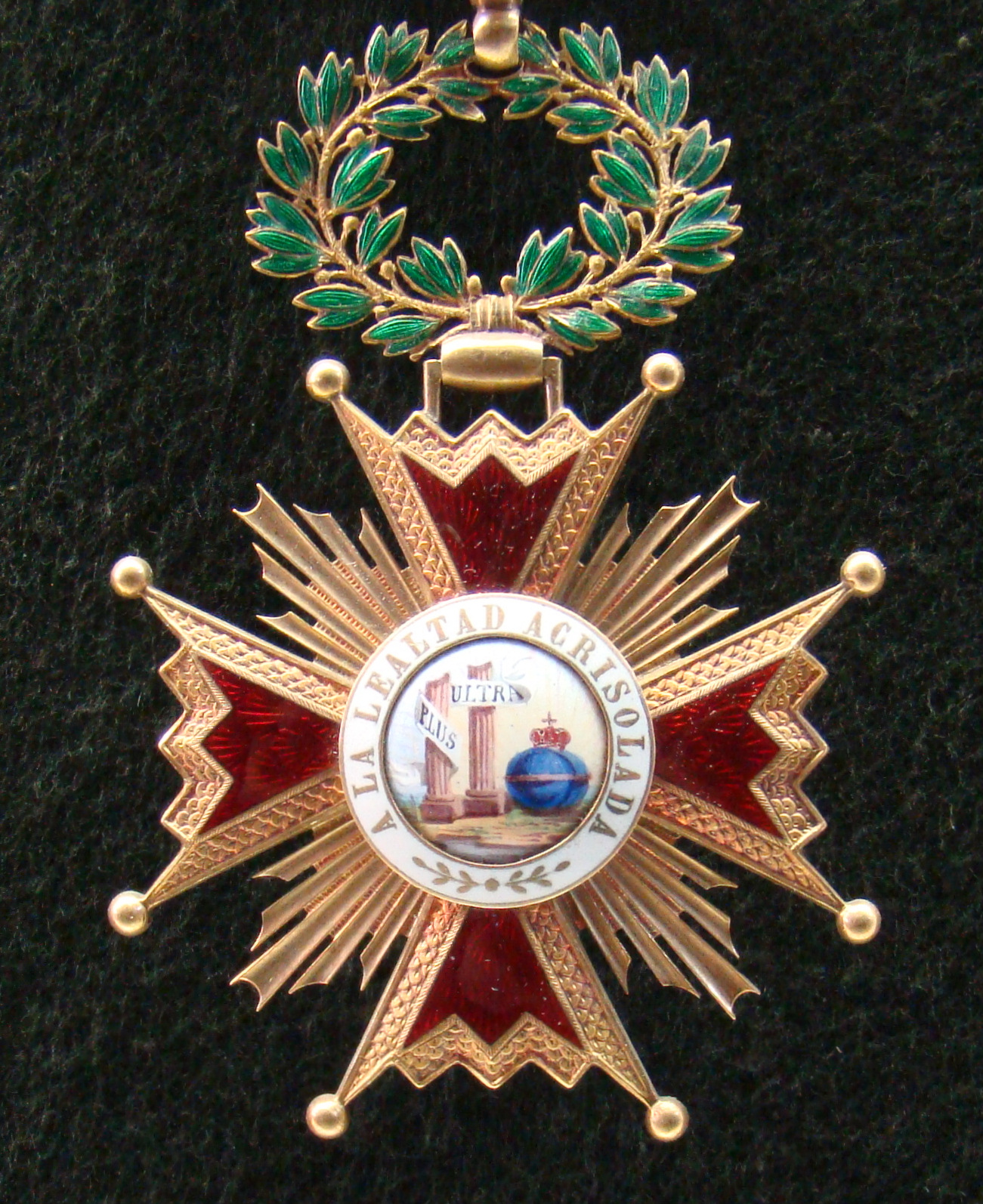
Spain Order of Isabella The Catholic

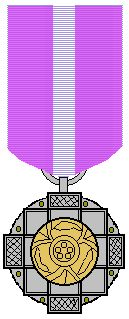
Padma Bhushan India

Ashok Seth is a Fellow of the Royal College of Physicians of Edinburgh, the Royal College of Physicians of Ireland and the Royal College of Physicians of London. Institutions such as the American College of Cardiology, the European Society of Cardiology, the Society of Cardiac Angiography and Intervention, the Cardiological Society of India and the International Medical Sciences Academy have also selected him as their Fellow. He has received the degree of Doctor of Science (DSc — Honoris Causa) from Banaras Hindu University, Teerthanker Mahaveer University and Amity University, Noida and the degree of Doctor of Letters (DLitt — Honoris Causa) from Jamia Millia Islamia University.

Seth, a Dudley Visiting Professor of the University of Birmingham, received the Distinguished Service Award from the IMA Academy of Medical Specialties in 1994. Two years later, he received the Shresth Shree Award of the Delhi Citizens' Forum For Civil Rights and the National Award for Outstanding Contribution to Society from the All India Khatri Mahasabha and in 1998, he received the Andreas Gruentzig Award. The year 1999 saw him getting two awards, the 20th Century Award for Achievement of International Biographical Centre, Cambridge and the Professional Excellence Award from the National Interventional Council of the Cardiological Society of India. The All India Conference of Intellectuals honoured him with Delhi Ratna Award in 2000, and he received the Indian Medical Association Distinguished Interventional Cardiologist Award, the Rotary Vocational Excellence Award and the IJCP Interventional Cardiologist of the Year Award in 2002.

The Government of India, in 2003, awarded him the civilian honour of Padma Shri and in 2005, he received IMA NDB Life Time Achievement Award and the DMA Medical Teachers' Award. He was also felicitated by the World Heart Federation, the same year. Delhi Medical Association awarded him again in 2006 with the DMA Legend in Interventional Cardiology Award and at the World Congress on Clinical and Preventive Cardiology (WCCPC2006), he was awarded the Life Time Achievement Award. The Geriatric Society of India also extended a Lifetime Achievement Award to him, in 2006.

In the year 2007, he received a citation from the Cardiological Society of India, IMA-NDB Distinguished Service Award, IMA Doctor's Day Award, IMA Magnanimous Award and the World Congress on Clinical and Preventive Cardiology 2007 Lifetime Achievement Award. He received the WCCPGC-2008 Lifetime Achievement Award and the 12th Annual MIDI Management Excellence Award in 2008. He was awarded the Sunday Indian and IIPM Mega Excellence Award, WCCPGC-2009 Lifetime Achievement Award and IMA Dr. K. Sharan Cardiology Excellence Award in 2009. The Government of Spain included him in the National Day Honours for the Order of Isabella the Catholic (Crus De Oficial Con Insignia Orden De Isabel La Catolica) in 2010, the same year as he received the Mason Sones Award from the Society of Cardiovascular Angiography and Interventions, USA and the Atma Jyoti Award from the World Academy of Spiritual Science.

The American Association of Cardiologists of Indian Origin (AACIO) recognised Seth's services with their Special Award in 2011 and he received three more awards the same year, Golden Pioneer of Interventional Cardiology Award from the Asian Interventional Cardiovascular Therapeutics, Lifetime Achievement Award by Rotary Club of Delhi, and the Vishisht Bihari Samman from the Bihar Shatabdi Utsav Aayojan Samiti. Delhi Medical association awarded him the title, Vishisht Chikitsa Ratan and the Jawaharlal Nehru Medical College, Aligarh selected him as the Most Glorious Alumni in 2012. He received three awards in 2014, Doc N Doc-Gammex Saviour Award, DMA Centenary Award and Hero Lifetime Achievement Award. The Government of India selected him again for Republic Day Honours for the award of Padma Bhushan in 2015.

Ashok Seth has delivered several Oration Award lectures and Mohan Lal Oration, Dr. Amalendu Das Oration, Hindustan Ciba Geigy Oration, IMA-NDB K. L. Chopra Oration, R. L. Sharma and Padmabhushan R. L. Joshi Memorial Oration, Prof. Raymond Wegmann Oration, Professor G. S. Sainani Oration and S. B. Khurana Memorial Oration are some of them.

== See also ==
- Atherectomy
- Drug Eluting Stents
- Ventricular assist device
- Angioscopy
- Embolectomy
- Transmyocardial revascularization
