= Gangrene (disambiguation) =

Gangrene is a severe medical condition caused by infection or a critically insufficient blood supply.

Gangrene may also refer to:

- Gangrene (album), a 2008 album by Mirrorthrone
- Gangrene (book), a 1976 novel by Jef Geeraerts
- Gangrene (group), an American hip hop production duo

== See also ==
- Gang Green (disambiguation)
