= TCOM =

TCOM may refer to:

- TCOM (linguistics), time of completion – a temporal reference for establishing tense
- Texas College of Osteopathic Medicine, a college of the University of North Texas in Fort Worth, Texas
- The Colour of Magic, a Discworld novel by Terry Pratchett
- Transcutaneous oxygen measurement - an assessment of the oxygen level beneath the skin
