= MiR-27b microRNA precursor =

MicroRNAs (miR) are small non-coding RNAs that regulate gene expression at the posttranscriptional level. MiR cluster 23/27/24 regulates angiogenesis, which is the process of forming new blood vessels by deposition of endothelial cells. There are 2 types of miR-27s found on endothelial cells: miR-27a and miR-27b. The actual mechanisms of miR-27s are not well known, but studies showed that overexpression of miR-27b increases angiogenesis. These results suggest that miR27b might be useful for treating patients with ischemic heart disease.

== Ischemic Heart Disease ==
Ischemic heart disease is the leading cause of morbidity and mortality in Western countries, and its incidence has increased drastically in the relatively short span of a few decades. Due to the blockage of the coronary arteries, blood supply to the heart is cut off which leads to inadequate supply of blood to the heart muscle resulting in ischemic heart disease.

== mir-27b and revascularization ==
A plausible treatment for patients with this disease is revascularization, which would restore blood supply to the heart. MiR-27b is linked to Semaphorin 6A, which is an inhibitor of angiogenesis. Overexpression of miR-27b decreased the protein expression of Semaphorin 6A which favored new blood vessel sprouting in the heart. To further determine that Semaphorin 6A is an inhibitor of angiogenesis, silencing of Semaphorin 6A using siRNA showed an increase in blood vessel formation further proven that mir-27b might be useful in treating patients with ischemic heart disease.

== mir-27b and thrombospondin-1 ==
MiR-27b also targets Thrombospondin-1, an antiangiogenic protein. Reduction in miR-27b increases Thrombospondin-1 levels, which decreases angiogenesis by silencing Drosha and Dicer. Thus, miR-27b can be used to promote angiogenesis in patients with ischemic heart disease by suppressing Thrombospondin-1.
