= Intermittent claudication =

Muscle pain from mild exertion

- Other names: Vascular claudication, claudicatio intermittens
- Specialty: Cardiology, vascular surgery

Intermittent claudication, also known as vascular claudication, is a symptom that describes muscle pain on mild exertion (ache, cramp, numbness or sense of fatigue), classically in the calf muscle, which occurs during exercise, such as walking, and is relieved by a short period of rest. It is classically associated with early-stage peripheral artery disease, and can progress to critical limb ischemia unless treated or risk factors are modified and maintained.

Claudication derives from Latin claudicare 'to limp'.

== Signs and symptoms ==
One of the hallmarks of arterial claudication is that it occurs intermittently. It disappears after a very brief rest and the patient can start walking again until the pain recurs. The following signs are general signs of atherosclerosis of the lower extremity arteries:

- cyanosis
- atrophic changes like loss of hair, shiny skin
- decreased temperature
- decreased pulse
- redness when limb is returned to a "dependent" position (part of Buerger's test)

The six "P"s of ischemia

- Pain
- Pallor (increased)
- Pulse (decreased)
- Perishing cold
- Paraesthesia
- Paralysis

== Causes ==
Most commonly, intermittent (or vascular or arterial) claudication is due to peripheral arterial disease which implies significant atherosclerotic blockages resulting in arterial insufficiency. Other uncommon causes are coarctation of the aorta, Trousseau disease and Buerger's disease (thromboangiitis obliterans), in which vasculitis occurs.

Raynaud's phenomenon functional vasospasm. It is distinct from neurogenic claudication, which is associated with lumbar spinal stenosis. It is strongly associated with smoking, hypertension, and diabetes.

== Diagnosis ==
Intermittent claudication is a symptom and is by definition diagnosed by a patient reporting a history of leg pain with walking relieved by rest. However, as other conditions such as sciatica can mimic intermittent claudication, testing is often performed to confirm the diagnosis of peripheral artery disease.

Magnetic resonance angiography and duplex ultrasonography appear to be slightly more cost-effective in diagnosing peripheral artery disease among people with intermittent claudication than projectional angiography.

== Treatment ==
Exercise can improve symptoms, as can revascularization. Both together may be better than one intervention of its own.

Supervised exercise improves maximum walking distance and pain-free walking distance more than home based exercise. Although when monitoring is included in home based exercise programmes similar changes in pain-free walking distance are observed in both supervised and home based exercise.

In people with stable leg pain, exercise, such as strength training, pole-striding and upper or lower limb exercises, compared to usual care or placebo improves maximum walking time, pain-free walking distance and maximum walking distance. Alternative exercise modes, such as cycling, strength training and upper-arm ergometry compared to supervised walking programmes showed no difference in maximum walking distance or pain-free walking distance for people with intermittent claudication.

Pharmacological options exist, as well. Medicines that control lipid profile, diabetes, and hypertension may increase blood flow to the affected muscles and allow for increased activity levels. Angiotensin converting enzyme inhibitors, adrenergic agents such as alpha-1 blockers and beta-blockers and alpha-2 agonists, antiplatelet agents (aspirin and clopidogrel), naftidrofuryl, pentoxifylline, and cilostazol (selective PDE3 inhibitor) are used for the treatment of intermittent claudication. However, medications will not remove the blockages from the body. Instead, they simply improve blood flow to the affected area.

Catheter-based intervention is also an option. Atherectomy, stenting, and angioplasty to remove or push aside the arterial blockages are the most common procedures for catheter-based intervention. These procedures can be performed by interventional radiologists, interventional cardiologists, vascular surgeons, and thoracic surgeons, among others.

Surgery is the last resort; vascular surgeons can perform either endarterectomies on arterial blockages or perform an arterial bypass. However, open surgery poses a host of risks not present with catheter-based interventions.

== Epidemiology ==
Atherosclerosis affects up to 10% of the Western population older than 65 years and for intermittent claudication this number is around 5%. Intermittent claudication most commonly manifests in men older than 50 years.

One in five of the middle-aged (65–75 years) population of the United Kingdom have evidence of peripheral arterial disease on clinical examination, although only a quarter of them have symptoms. The most common symptom is muscle pain in the lower limbs on exercise—intermittent claudication.

== See also ==
- Exercise intolerance
- Peripheral artery disease
- Metabolic myopathies
- Second wind
