= Peripheral vascular examination =

- Purpose: assess signs of pathology in the peripheral vascular system

A peripheral vascular examination is a medical examination to discover signs of pathology in the peripheral vascular system. It is performed as part of a physical examination, or when a patient presents with leg pain suggestive of a cardiovascular pathology, typically peripheral artery disease.

The exam includes several parts: Position/lighting/draping, Inspection, Palpation, Auscultation, and Special maneuvers.

== Position/lighting/draping ==
For this procedure the patient is positioned lying in the supine position on a flat bed or examination table. The patient's hands should remain at their sides with their head resting on a pillow. Lighting needs to be adjusted so that it is ideal. Proper draping has the legs should be exposed, the groin and thigh covered, with drapes are usually placed between the legs.

== Inspection ==
On inspection the clinician looks for signs of:

- trauma
- previous surgery (scars)
- muscle wasting/muscle asymmetry
- edema (swelling)
- erythema (redness)
- ulcers – arterial ulcers tend to be on the borders / sides of the foot, neuropathic ulcers on the plantar surface of the foot, venous ulcers tend on be on the medial aspect of the leg superior to the medial malleolus.
- hair – hair is absent in peripheral vascular disease (PVD)
- shiny skin – seen in PVD
- Haemosiderin deposits
- Lipodermatosclerosis

== Palpation ==
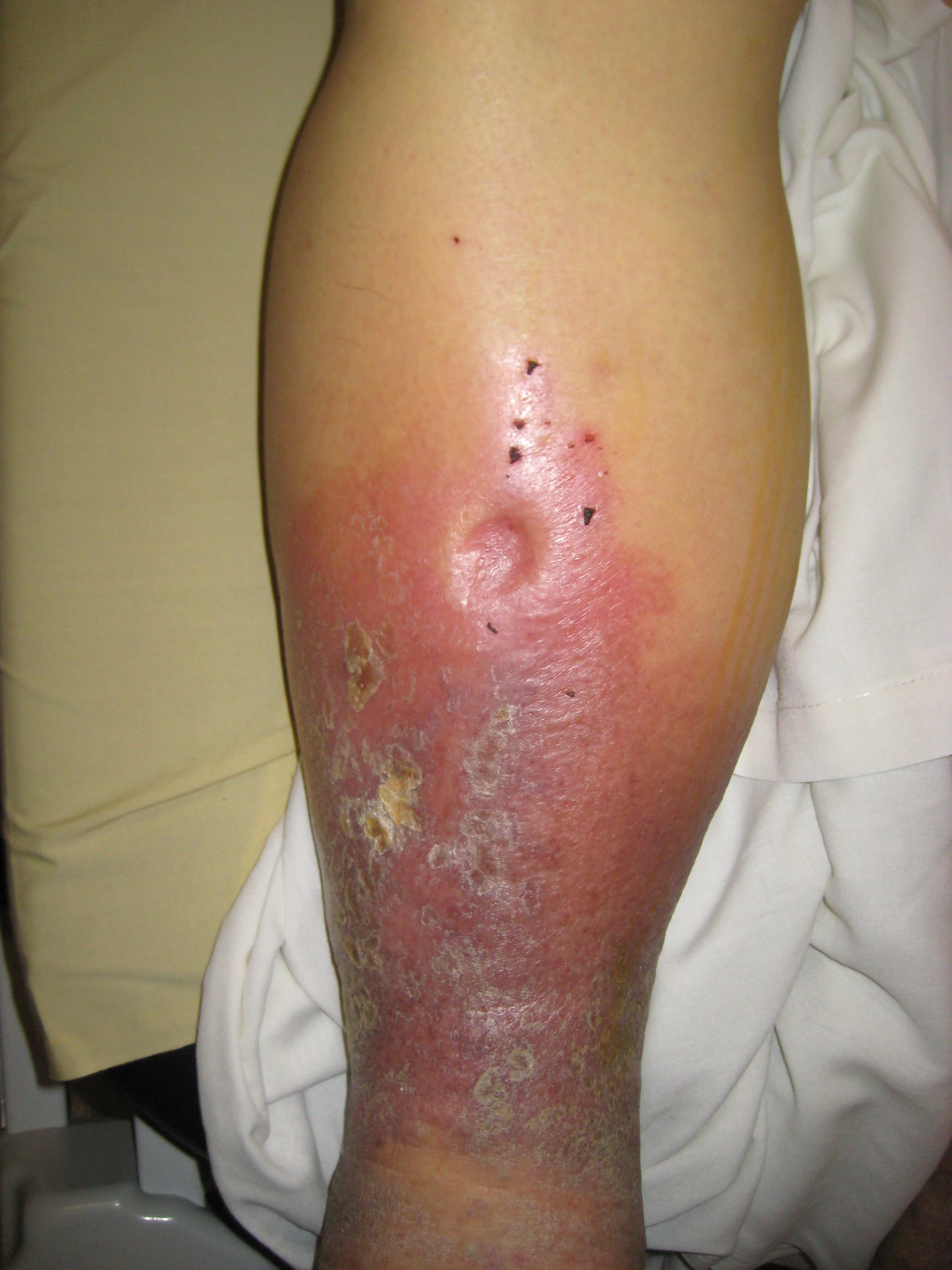
Example of pitting edema in a person with liver failure

- Temperature – cool suggest poor circulation, sides should be compared
- Pitting edema – should be tested for in dependent locations – dorsum of foot, if present then on the shins. If the patient has been in bed for a longer period of time one should check the sacrum.
- Capillary refill – should be less than 3 seconds.

=== Arterial pulses ===
- Dorsalis pedis artery pulse – on dorsal surface of the foot, running lateral to the tendon of the first toe
- Posterior tibial artery pulse – posterior and inferior to the medial malleolus
- Popliteal artery pulse – behind the knee, typically done with both hands
- Femoral artery pulse – in the femoral triangle / halfway between the ASIS and pubic tubercle

== Auscultation ==
- For femoral artery bruits

== Special maneuvers ==
- Ankle-brachial pressure index (ABPI) assesses peripheral vascular disease. It may however be unreliable in patients with calcified arteries in the calf (often diabetic patients) or those with extensive oedema, in which case toe pressure or Toe-brachial pressure index (TBPI) should be measured to aid in the diagnosis.
- Venous refill with dependency (should be less than 30 seconds) – the vein should bulge outward within 30 seconds of elevation for one minute.
- Buerger's test (assessment of arterial sufficiency):
  With the patient supine, note the colour of the feet soles. They should be pink. Then elevate both legs to 45 degrees for more than 1 minute. Observe the soles. If there is marked pallor (whiteness), ischemia should be suspected. Next check for rubor of dependency. Sit the patient upright and observe the feet. In normal patients, the feet quickly turn pink. If, more slowly, they turn red like a cooked lobster, suspect ischemia.
- Brodie-Trendelenburg test (assessment of valvular competence if varicose veins are present):
  One leg at a time. With the patient supine, empty the superficial veins by 'milking' the leg in the distal to proximal direction. Now press with your thumb over the saphenofemoral junction (2.5 cm below and 2.5 cm lateral to the pubic tubercle) and ask the patient to stand while you maintain pressure. If the leg veins now refill rapidly, the incompetence is located below the saphenofemoral junction, and vice versa. This test can be repeated using pressure at any point along the leg until the incompetence has been mapped out.
