= Toe pressure =

Technique to assess peripheral artery disease

- Purpose: assessment of severe peripheral artery disease,

Blood pressure in toes can be measured using special equipment, and is often valuable in assessment of severe peripheral artery disease, in particular in patients with diabetes where measurement of ankle pressure / ABPI is often unreliable (because of local stiffening of arterial wall).

== Measurement ==
Feet are often cold and to make sure measurement is not affected by local vasoconstriction, the patient's feet may be pre-warmed in water or by warm air to a skin temperature of around 30 °C. Measurement is done with the patient lying flat, with feet at heart level, using sphygmomanometry: the big toe is slightly emptied of blood by squeezing, and a small cuff is inflated around the base of the toe. Cuff pressure is then slowly lowered until flow can be detected in the distal part of the toe, e.g. by optical means (photocell), by expansion of the toe as measured with strain gauge plethysmography, or by visual assessment of color change by an experienced examiner, and the pressure at which this occurs is recorded.

== Interpretation of results ==
Toe pressure is usually slightly lower than arm blood pressure; a difference of up to 50mmHg is considered acceptable. Toe pressures below 30 mmHg (in diabetics, 50mmHg) are pathological and associated with reduced viability of the tissue and risk of amputation.
