= Gang Green (disambiguation) =

Gang Green is a punk rock band from Braintree, Massachusetts.

Gang Green may refer to:

- Gang Green, a short-lived Onyx-affiliated rap group
- A nickname for the New York Jets football team.
- Professor Gangreen, The main villain in Return of the Killer Tomatoes
- The Gangreen Gang, characters in The Powerpuff Girls

== See also ==
- Gangrene (disambiguation)
