= Leo Buerger =

Austrian American physician

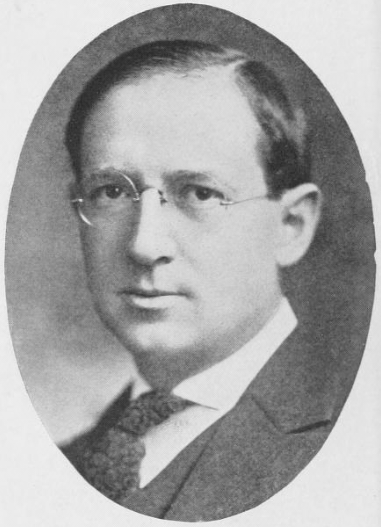
- Born: September 13, 1879; Vienna, Austria-Hungary
- Died: October 6, 1943 (aged 64); New York, New York, US
- Education: City College of New York; College of Physicians and Surgeons
- Occupations: Pathologist, surgeon, urologist
- Spouses: Germaine Schnitzer (m. 1913; div. 1927) Anne Kathleen Johnson (m. 1936)
- Children: 2

Leo Buerger (English /bɜːrɡər/; German pronunciation: [/byːɐ̯gəɐ̯/]; September 13, 1879 – October 6, 1943) was an Austrian American pathologist, surgeon and urologist. Buerger's disease is named for him.

== Family and education ==
Buerger was born in Vienna into a Jewish family, who immigrated to the United States when he was seven (either in 1886 or 1887). He attended several elementary schools in New York, Chicago, and Philadelphia.

Buerger matriculated to the City College of New York, where he earned a B.A. in 1897, followed by studies at the College of Physicians and Surgeons, the medical school of Columbia University, where he obtained both his M.A. and M.D. in 1901. He developed his surgical skills in Breslau, Germany (now Wrocław, Poland) in 1905–1906. There he also studied urology and arterial disease, fields in which he excelled later in life.

He was married twice; his first wife was Germaine Schnitzer, a French pianist trained in Vienna whom he married on May 5, 1913. They had two children before they divorced in 1927. He remarried to Anne Kathleen Johnson in 1936.

== Career ==
Initially, Buerger practiced at the Lenox Hill Hospital (1901–1904), then the Mount Sinai Hospital (1904–1905), then as a volunteer in the surgical clinic at Breslau with study visits to Vienna and Paris. From 1907–1920, Buerger worked as a pathologist and surgeon at Mount Sinai Hospital. There in 1908 he gave the first accurate pathological description of thromboangiitis obliterans or Buerger's disease, a disease of the circulatory system associated with smoking first reported by Felix von Winiwarter in 1879. In the same year, he assisted in the development of the Brown-Buerger cystoscope. For nearly 60 years, it remained the workhorse of the American urology. It was the leading cystoscope in the U.S. until the advent of fiberoptic illumination with modern lens systems in the 1970s.He also devised an operating cystoscope in 1910, as well as other urologic instruments.

Later, as a surgeon, he practiced at several other clinics in New York: Beth David Hospital, Bronx Hospital, and Wyckoff Heights Hospital, Brooklyn. In 1917 he received a professorship at the Medical Urology Outpatient Clinic New York, which he held until 1930. He then took up a similar position of the College of Medical Evangelists, Los Angeles (California), but worked there for only a short time before returning to New York to work in private practice.

In 1924, he described his eponymous test for lower limb ischemia (Buerger's test). It involves the observation of color changes of the foot during elevation and lowering of the lower limb. He is credited for many other developments in the field of vascular pathology. Aside from discovering Buerger disease and Buerger's test, he authored the book Circulatory Disturbances of the Extremities. He is also credited with developing the Buerger's exercises or Buerger-Allen exercises which were later modified by Arthus Allen. The exercises intend to improve lower limb circulation. The legs are held at 45 to 90 degrees until the skin blanches. They are then lowered below the level of the rest of the body at 90 degrees. Finally, the patient is laid flat in bed. Typical times for each step are 2 to 3 minutes in an elevated position, 5 to 10 minutes dependent, and then flat on the bed for 10 minutes.

He also worked in the field of bacteriology, including contributions to differentiate streptococci and pneumococci.

Buerger belonged to the American Medical Association, the American College of Surgeons, the American Urological Association, the New York Academy of Medicine, the Harvey Society, and Phi Beta Kappa.

== Family and death ==
In 1917, Buerger operated on the famed actor Sarah Bernhardt, and when Buerger's daughter Yvonne was born in November that year, Bernhardt sent a telegraph from Cleveland requesting that she be named the newborn's godmother and that the baby bear Bernhardt's name. Yvonne Sarah Bernhardt Buerger predeceased her father by one year.

Buerger died at his residence at the Sherry-Netherland Hotel on Fifth Avenue and 59th Street in Manhattan after a two-week illness.

== Publications ==
Buerger alone or in collaboration wrote more than 160 articles in various scientific journals.

- "Thrombo-Angiitis Obliterans: A study of the vascular lesions leading to presenile spontaneous gangrene". Am J Med Sci 136 (1908) 567
- "The pathology of the vessels in cases of gangrene of the lower extremities due to so-called endarteritis obliterans". Proc Soc NY Pathol 8 (1908) 48
- Diseases of the Circulatory Extremities. 1924

== Bibliography ==
- E. J. Wormer, Angiology - Phlebology. Syndromes and their creators. Munich, 1991, pp. 225–234.
- P. Rentchnick, "Le centenaire de la naissance du Dr Leo Buerger," in Méd Hygiène 38 (1980), p. 192.
- G. W. Kaplan, "Leo Buerger (1879-1973)," in Invest Urol 11 (1974), pp. 342-43.
- A. Birch, "Leo Buerger, 1879-1943," in Practitioner 211 (1973), p. 823.
- S. Kagan, Jewish Medicine. Boston, 1952, p. 71
