= Gangrene =

Type of tissue death by ischemia

- Other names: Gangrenous necrosis
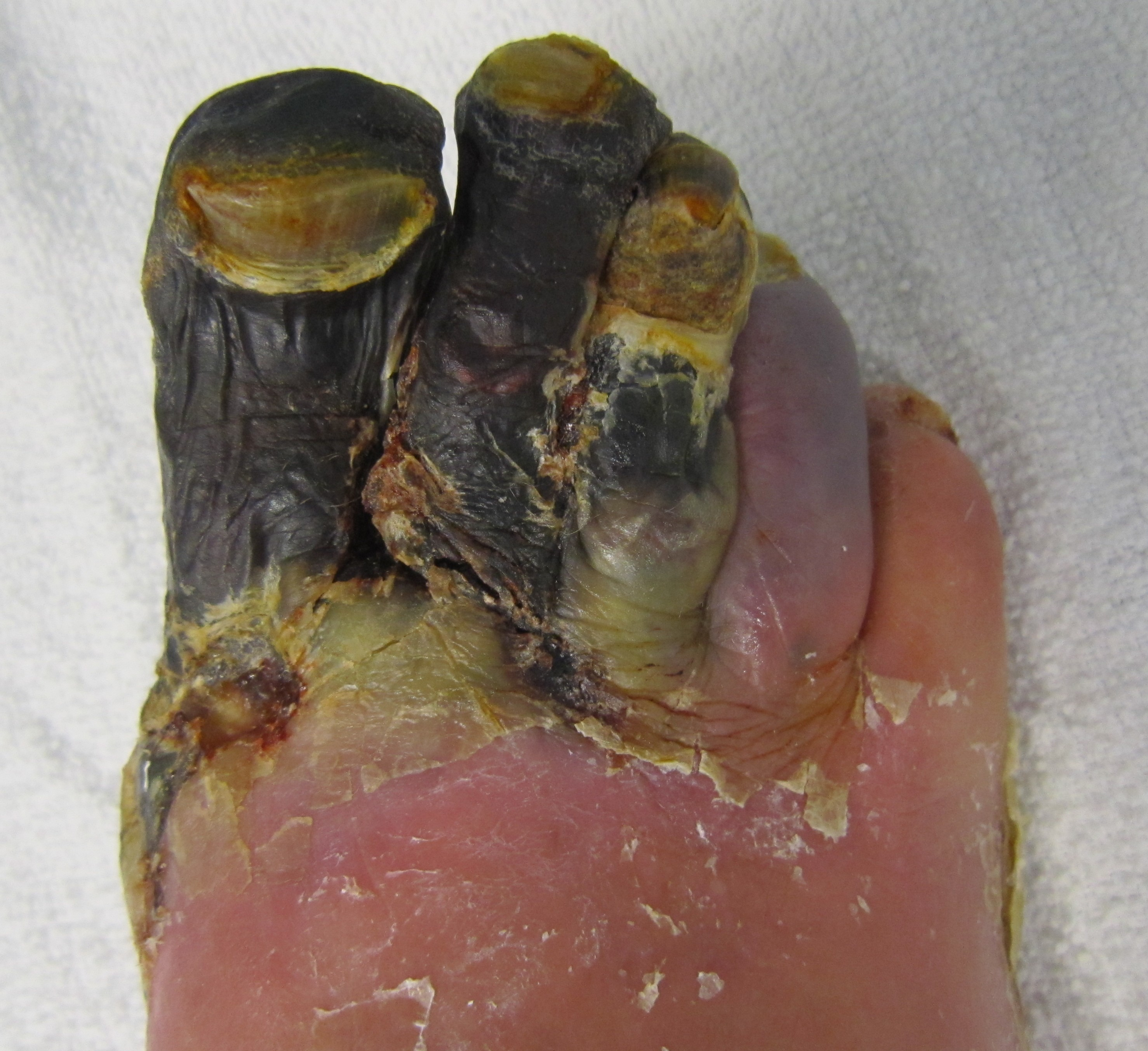
- Dry gangrene affecting the toes as a result of peripheral artery disease
- Specialty: Infectious disease, surgery, podiatry
- Symptoms: Change in skin color to red or black, numbness, pain, skin breakdown, coolness
- Complications: Sepsis, amputation
- Types: Dry, wet, gas, internal, necrotizing fasciitis
- Risk factors: Diabetes, peripheral arterial disease, smoking, major trauma, alcoholism, plague, HIV/AIDS, frostbite, Raynaud's syndrome
- Diagnostic method: Based on symptom, with medical imaging used to identify the underlying cause.
- Treatment: Depends on underlying cause
- Prognosis: Variable
- Frequency: Unknown

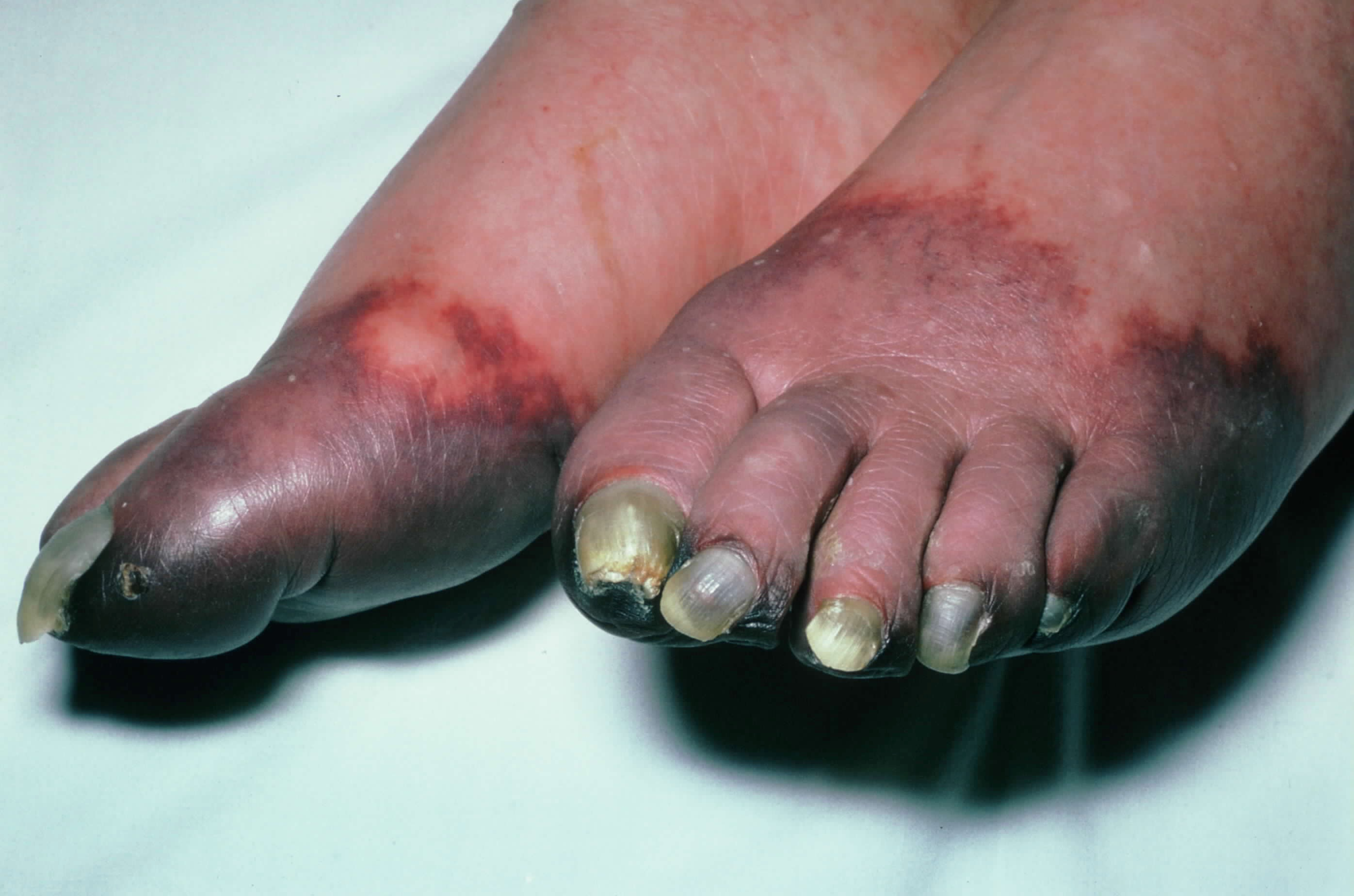
Gangrenous toes in a diabetic

Gangrene is a type of tissue death caused by a lack of blood supply. Symptoms may include a change in skin color to red or black, numbness, swelling, pain, skin breakdown, and coolness. The feet and hands are most commonly affected. If the gangrene is caused by an infectious agent, it may present with a fever or sepsis.

Risk factors include diabetes, peripheral arterial disease, smoking, major trauma, alcoholism, HIV/AIDS, frostbite, influenza, dengue fever, malaria, chickenpox, plague, hypernatremia, radiation injuries, meningococcal disease, Group B streptococcal infection and Raynaud's syndrome. It can be classified as dry gangrene, wet gangrene, gas gangrene, internal gangrene, and necrotizing fasciitis. The diagnosis of gangrene is based on symptoms and supported by tests such as medical imaging.

Treatment may involve surgery to remove the dead tissue, antibiotics to treat any infection, and efforts to address the underlying cause. Surgical efforts may include debridement, amputation, or the use of maggot therapy. Efforts to treat the underlying cause may include bypass surgery or angioplasty. In certain cases, hyperbaric oxygen therapy may be useful. How commonly the condition occurs is unknown.

== Etymology ==
The etymology of gangrene derives from the Latin word gangraena and from the Greek gangraina (γάγγραινα), which means "putrefaction of tissues".

== Signs and symptoms ==
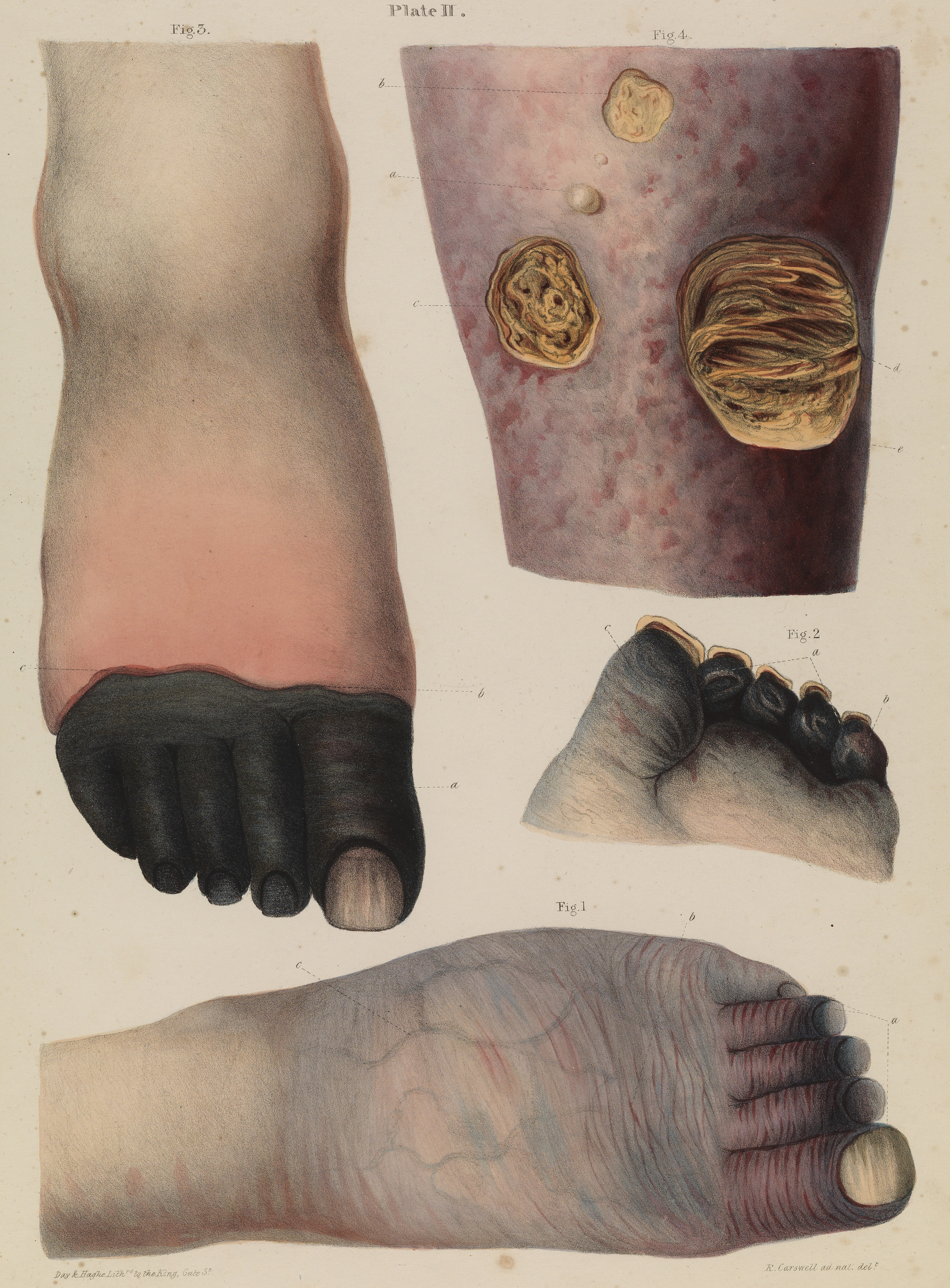
An illustration showing four different stages of gangrene, including one (Fig. 4 top right) caused by an obstacle to the return of the venous blood due to heart disease.

Symptoms may include a change in skin color to red or black, numbness, pain, skin breakdown, and coolness. The feet and hands are most commonly involved.

== Causes ==
Gangrene is caused by a critically insufficient blood supply (e.g., peripheral vascular disease) or infection. It is associated with diabetes and long-term tobacco smoking.

=== Dry gangrene ===
Dry gangrene is a form of coagulative necrosis that develops in ischemic tissue, where the blood supply is inadequate to keep tissue viable. It is not a disease itself, but a symptom of other diseases. The term dry is used only when referring to a limb or to the gut (in other locations, this same type of necrosis is called an infarction, such as myocardial infarction). Dry gangrene is often due to peripheral artery disease, but can be due to acute limb ischemia. As a result, people with atherosclerosis, high cholesterol, diabetes and smokers commonly have dry gangrene. The limited oxygen in the ischemic limb limits putrefaction and bacteria fail to survive. The affected part is dry, shrunken, and dark reddish-black. The line of separation usually brings about complete separation, with eventual falling off of the gangrenous tissue if it is not removed surgically, a process called autoamputation.

Dry gangrene is the result of chronic ischemia without infection. If ischemia is detected early, when ischemic wounds rather than gangrene are present, the process can be treated by revascularization (via vascular bypass or angioplasty). However, once gangrene has developed, the affected tissues are not salvageable. Because dry gangrene is not accompanied by infection, it is not as emergent as gas gangrene or wet gangrene, both of which have a risk of sepsis. Over time, dry gangrene may develop into wet gangrene if an infection develops in the dead tissues.

Diabetes mellitus is a risk factor for peripheral vascular disease, thus for dry gangrene, but also a risk factor for wet gangrene, particularly in patients with poorly controlled blood sugar levels, as elevated serum glucose creates a favorable environment for bacterial infection.

=== Wet gangrene ===
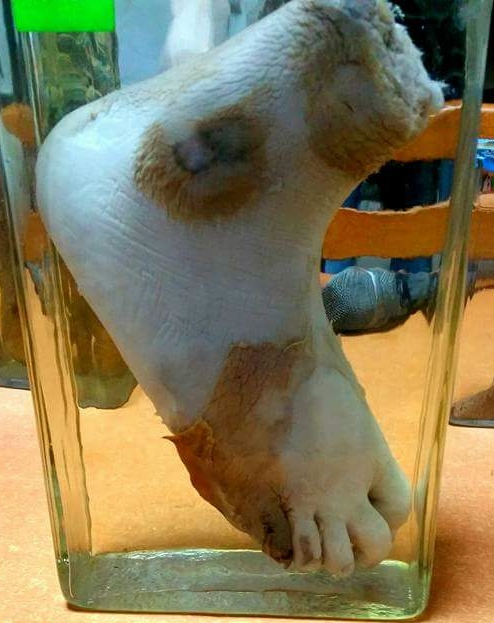
Wet gangrene of the foot.

Wet, or infected, gangrene is characterized by thriving bacteria and has a poor prognosis (compared to dry gangrene) due to sepsis resulting from the free communication between infected fluid and circulatory fluid. In wet gangrene, the tissue is infected by saprogenic microorganisms (Clostridium perfringens or Bacillus fusiformis, for example), which cause tissue to swell and emit a foul odor. Wet gangrene usually develops rapidly due to blockage of venous (mainly) or arterial blood flow. The affected part is saturated with stagnant blood, which promotes the rapid growth of bacteria. The toxic products formed by bacteria are absorbed, causing systemic manifestation of sepsis and finally death. The affected part is edematous, soft, putrid, rotten, and dark.

Because of the high mortality associated with infected gangrene (about 80% without treatment and 20% with treatment), an emergency salvage amputation, such as a guillotine amputation, is often needed to limit systemic effects of the infection. Such an amputation can be converted to a formal amputation, such as a below- or above-knee amputation.

=== Gas gangrene ===
Gas gangrene is a bacterial infection that produces gas within tissues. It can be caused by Clostridium, most commonly alpha toxin-producing C. perfringens, or various nonclostridial species. Infection spreads rapidly as the gases produced by the bacteria expand and infiltrate healthy tissue in the vicinity. Because of its ability to quickly spread to surrounding tissues, gas gangrene should be treated as a medical emergency.

Gas gangrene is caused by bacterial exotoxin-producing clostridial species, which are mostly found in soil, and other anaerobes such as Bacteroides and anaerobic streptococci. These environmental bacteria may enter the muscle through a wound and subsequently proliferate in necrotic tissue and secrete powerful toxins that destroy nearby tissue, generating gas at the same time. A gas composition of 5.9% hydrogen, 3.4% carbon dioxide, 74.5% nitrogen, and 16.1% oxygen was reported in one clinical case.

Gas gangrene can cause necrosis, gas production, and sepsis. Progression to toxemia and shock is often very rapid.

=== Other types ===
- Necrotizing fasciitis is a rare infection that spreads deep into the body along tissue planes. It is categorized into four subtypes, with the first two being the most common. Type 1 requires an infection with an anaerobe and a species in the Enterobacteriaceae family, while type 2 is characterized by infection with Streptococcus pyogenes, a Gram-positive cocci bacteria, and thus is also known as hemolytic streptococcal gangrene.
- Noma is a gangrene of the face most often found in Africa, Southeast Asia and South America.
- Fournier gangrene is a type of necrotizing fasciitis that usually affects the genitals and groin.
- Venous limb gangrene may be caused by Heparin-induced thrombocytopenia and thrombosis.
- Severe mesenteric ischemia may result in gangrene of the small intestine.
- Severe ischemic colitis may result in gangrene of the large intestine.

== Treatment ==
Treatment varies based on the severity and type of gangrene.

=== Lifestyle ===
Exercises such as walking and massage therapy may be tried.

=== Medication ===
Medications may include pain management, medications that promote circulation in the circulatory system and antibiotics. Since gangrene is associated with periodic pain caused by too little blood flow, pain management is important so patients can continue doing exercises that promote circulation. Pain management medications can include opioids and opioid-like analgesics. Since gangrene is a result of ischemia, circulatory system management is important. These medications can include antiplatelet drug, anticoagulant, and fibrinolytics. As infection is often associated with gangrene, antibiotics are often a critical component of its treatment. The life-threatening nature of gangrene requires treatment with intravenous antibiotics in an inpatient setting. Antibiotics alone are not effective because they may not penetrate infected tissues sufficiently.

=== Surgery ===
Surgical removal of all dead tissue, however, is the mainstay of treatment for gangrene. Often, gangrene is associated with underlying infection, thus the gangrenous tissue must be debrided to hinder the spread of the associated infection. The extent of surgical debridement needed depends on the extent of the gangrene and may be limited to the removal of a finger, toe, or ear, but in severe cases may involve a limb amputation.

Dead tissue alone does not require debridement, and in some cases, such as dry gangrene, the affected part falls off (autoamputates), making surgical removal unnecessary. Waiting for autoamputation, however, may cause health complications as well as decreased quality of life.

After the gangrene is treated with debridement and antibiotics, the underlying cause can be treated. In the case of gangrene due to critical limb ischemia, revascularization can be performed to treat the underlying peripheral underlateral artery disease.

Ischemic disease of the legs is the most common reason for amputations. In about a quarter of these cases, the other side requires amputation in the next three years.

Angioplasty should be considered if severe blockage in lower leg vessels (tibial and peroneal artery) leads to gangrene.

=== Other ===
Hyperbaric oxygen therapy treatment is used to treat gas gangrene. It increases pressure and oxygen content to allow blood to carry more oxygen to inhibit anaerobic organism growth and reproduction.

Regenerative medical treatments and stem-cell therapies have successfully altered gangrene and ulcer prognosis.

== History ==
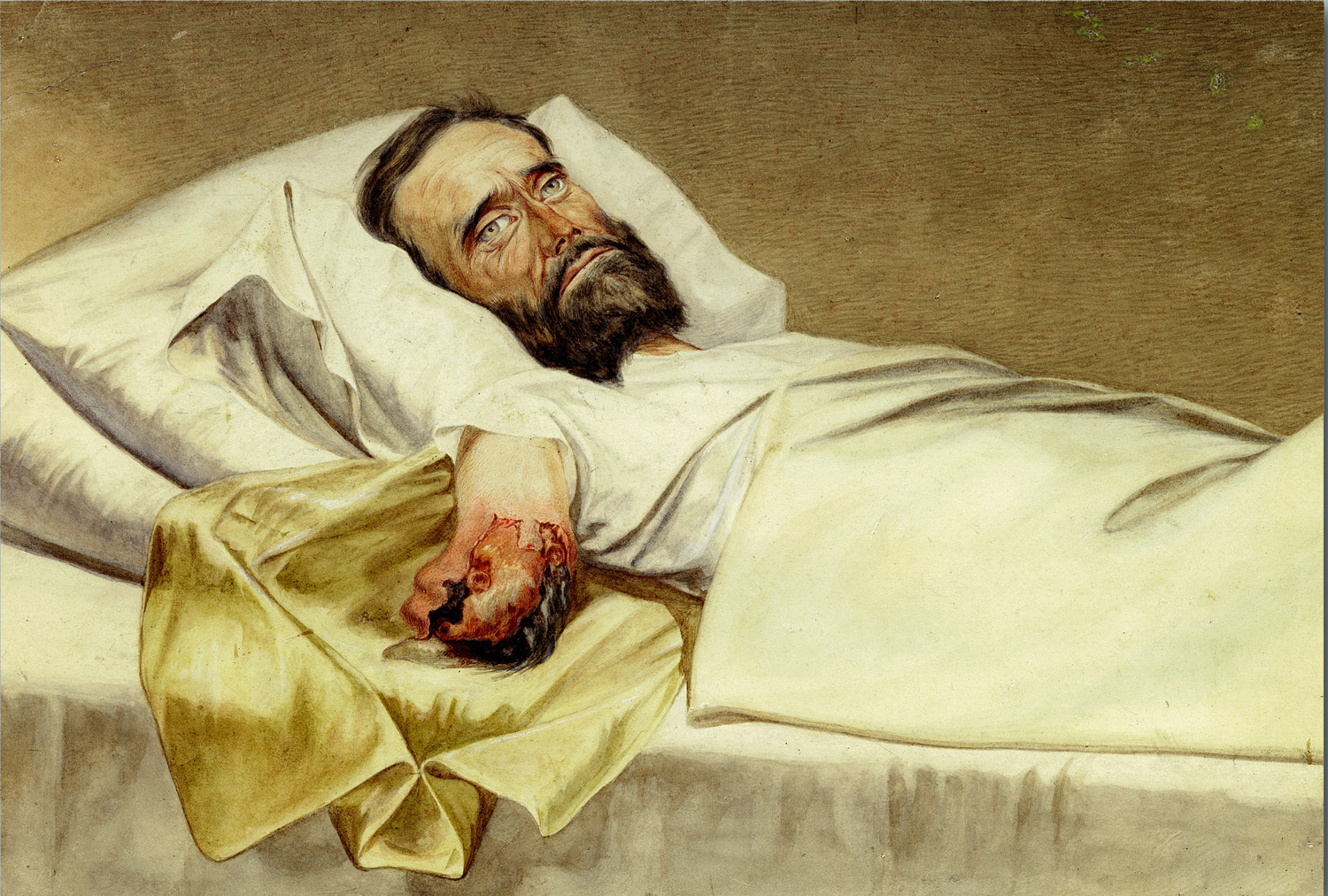
Union Army Private Milton E. Wallen lies in bed with a gangrenous amputated arm

As early as 1028, flies and maggots were commonly used to treat chronic wounds or ulcers to prevent or arrest necrotic spread, as some species of maggots consume only dead flesh, leaving nearby living tissue unaffected. This practice largely died out after the introduction of antibiotics to the range of treatments for wounds. In recent times, however, maggot therapy has regained some credibility and is sometimes employed with great efficacy in cases of chronic tissue necrosis.

The French Baroque composer Jean-Baptiste Lully contracted gangrene in January 1687 when, while conducting a performance of his Te Deum, he stabbed his own toe with his pointed staff (which was used as a baton). The disease spread to his leg, but the composer refused to have his toe amputated, which eventually led to his death in March of that year.

French King Louis XIV died of gangrene in his leg on 1 September 1715, four days prior to his 77th birthday.

Sebald Justinus Brugmans, Professor at Leyden University, from 1795 on Director of the Medical Bureau of the Batavian Republic, and inspector-general of the French Imperial Military Health-Service in 1811, became a leading expert in the fight against hospital-gangrene and its prevention. He wrote a treatise on gangrene in 1814 in which he meticulously analyzed and explained the causes of this dreadful disease, which he was convinced was contagious. He completed his entry with a thorough evaluation of all possible and well experienced sanitary regulations. His work was very well received and was instrumental in convincing most later authors that gangrene was a contagious disease.

John M. Trombold wrote: "Middleton Goldsmith, a surgeon in the Union Army during the American Civil War, meticulously studied hospital gangrene and developed a revolutionary treatment regimen. The cumulative Civil War hospital gangrene mortality was 45%. Goldsmith's method, which he applied to over 330 cases, yielded a mortality under 3%." Goldsmith advocated the use of debridement and topical and injected bromide solutions on infected wounds to reduce the incidence and virulence of "poisoned miasma". Copies of his book were issued to Union surgeons to encourage the use of his methods.
