= Germaine Schnitzer =

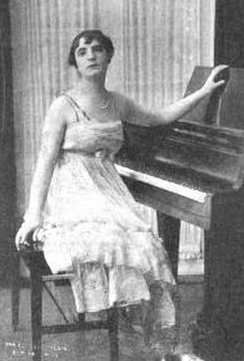
- Germaine Schnitzer, from a 1920 publication

Background information
- Born: May 28, 1888; Paris, France
- Died: September 18, 1982; New York City, US
- Instrument: piano

Germaine Schnitzer (May 28, 1888 — September 18, 1982) was a French-born pianist based in New York.

== Early life ==
Germaine Alice Schnitzer was born in Paris and studied music at the Conservatoire de Paris, with further training under Raoul Pugno and with Emil von Sauer at the Vienna Conservatory. She was sometimes referred to as "Viennese", and while in Vienna won a prize for music from the Austrian government.

== Musical career ==
Schnitzer was a pianist with a busy concert career in North America and Europe. She played in New York with the Russian Symphony Orchestra and the Dresden Philharmonic Orchestra, toured Holland, and toured in Russia until she sprained her ankle, all during 1908 and 1909. She played a dual recital with American violinist Francis MacMillen at Carnegie Hall in 1916. She gave a series of recitals in New York in 1920, before embarking on a European tour. The tour was cut short when she returned to New York to be with her husband during a hospitalization. She toured in Europe again in 1922.

She received wide critical praise for her technique and interpretation of the romantic composers, especially Robert Schumann. Another reviewer was less enthusiastic, calling her "solid and substantial" performance "massive even ponderous and lacking an emotional basis". She affirmed that technique was her emphasis: "I do not believe that a public performer is best served by giving himself up entirely to the emotional phase of his expression, since he is almost surely to fall into rhythmic and other excess which may mar the more worthy element of clarity," she told an interviewer in 1920. She was interviewed for a chapter in Harriette Moore Brower's Piano Mastery (1915). Schnitzer recorded several piano rolls for Ampico.

== Later incidents ==
In 1931, Schnitzer's career ended when she was badly injured in a traffic accident in New York, and remained partially paralyzed. She won a judgment of $150,000 after suing the taxi company in 1934, though it is unlikely she was ever paid. In 1944 she admitted her part in a conspiracy to violate the Export Control Act, to help her brother Georges Schnitzer, a banker in Belgium, access his frozen accounts during World War II. She pleaded guilty, testified for the government, and was eventually fined $5000. Her donation to the New York Times Neediest Cases Fund in 1979 was noted by the paper, because of her advanced age.

== Personal life ==
Germaine Schnitzer married Leo Buerger, a pathologist, in 1913. She sued him for divorce in 1927. She had a son, Gerald Henri Buerger (later known as Gerry Kean, an actor, playwright, and director), and a daughter, Yvonne Sarah Buerger Jones (1920–1942). Yvonne's godmother was Schnitzer's friend, actress Sarah Bernhardt. Yvonne's husband at the time of her death was actor Henry Burk Jones. Germaine Schnitzer died in 1982, aged 94 years, in New York. Her gravesite is with her daughter's, in Ridgefield, Connecticut. Theatre administrator Robert C. Schnitzer (1906–2008), also based in Connecticut, was her nephew, the son of her brother Louis Schnitzer.
