= Internal gangrene =

Internal gangrene is a general term for necrosis of an internal organ, such as the large intestine, appendix, or small intestine. It may refer to:

- Ischemic colitis, large intestine
- Mesenteric ischemia, small intestine

== See also ==
- Gangrene (disambiguation)
