= Gangrene (book) =

Gangrene is a 1968 novel written by Flemish writer and former Assistant Direct Commissioner in the Belgian Congo Jef Geeraerts. Also referred to as Black Venus, this is the first of four books belonging to Geeraerts’ Gangrene cycle. The narrator bears the author’s name, and the book is widely considered to be a fictionalized yet largely autobiographical account of Geeraerts’ experiences in the Belgian Congo towards the end of the Belgian colonial era, leading towards the Congo’s independence in 1960.

== Style ==
Although Gangrene takes the form of a novel, the style is deliberately journalistic in nature: “They call me an author,” Geeraerts once said, “but primarily I am a journalist. My books deal with situations I know through and through, about regions where I lived long enough to get a good sense of them, about things I experienced personally”. His writings have also been described as being “therapeutic”.

== Plot summary ==
Working as a commissioner in the Belgian Congo, narrator Jef Geeraerts depicts his day-to-day interactions with Congolese people and fellow colonists, his various journeys beyond his colonial station, and finally, the disintegration of the colony itself at the advent of Congolese independence. Known for its graphic sexual content, Gangrene narrates numerous affairs with local women, ranging from his second wife Mbala, several young sex workers, a heavily pregnant woman, a pair of sisters, and a variety of other characters and groups of people. Gangrene also depicts numerous instances of violent conflict between the Belgian Congo’s military forces and local armed militias. Towards the end of the novel, Geeraerts’ character abandons his post to flee the country, as the independence movement drove the colony into increasing chaos.

== Reception ==
Both accolades and controversy followed Gangrene’s publication at both the national and public level: “First the Belgian government awarded the novel the national prose prize, then that self-same government seized the book in order to investigate its lascivious character,” responding to accusations of racism and pornography. Reviews of the work consistently describe the book as “controversial” and “explicit”. The book is also widely viewed as a critique of Belgian colonization. In fact, Gangrene was accused of allegedly “giving such a harsh account of the violent 1959 military expedition in the Kasai area that Belgian army authorities publicly refuted its contents”.
