= Buerger's test =

Medical test of the circulatory system

- Purpose: assessment of arterial sufficiency.

Buerger's test is performed in an assessment of arterial sufficiency. It is named after Leo Buerger. The vascular angle, which is also called Buerger's angle, is the angle to which the leg has to be raised before it becomes pale, whilst lying down. In a limb with a normal circulation the toes and sole of the foot, stay pink, even when the limb is raised by 90 degrees. In an ischaemic leg, elevation to 15 degrees or 30 degrees for 30 to 60 seconds may cause pallor. (This part of the test checks for elevation pallor.) A vascular angle of less than 20 degrees indicates severe ischaemia.

From a sitting position, in normal circulation, the foot will quickly return to a pink colour. Where there is peripheral artery disease the leg will revert to the pink colour more slowly than normal and also pass through the normal pinkness to a red-range colouring (rubor - redness) often known as sunset foot. This is due to the dilatation of the arterioles in an attempt to rid the metabolic waste that has built up in a reactive hyperaemia. Finally the foot will return to its normal colour. This part of the test is known as a check for rubor of dependency.

The test may also be used in the diagnosis of erythromelalgia.

== See also ==
- Peripheral vascular examination
- Claudication
