= Ankle–brachial pressure index =

Ratio of the blood pressure at the ankle and upper arm

- Measuring the ankle-brachial index
- Synonyms: Ankle-brachial index
- Purpose: Detection of peripheral artery disease

The ankle-brachial pressure index (ABPI) or ankle-brachial index (ABI) is the ratio of the blood pressure at the ankle to the blood pressure in the upper arm (brachium). Compared to the arm, lower blood pressure in the leg suggests blocked arteries due to peripheral artery disease (PAD). The ABPI is calculated by dividing the systolic blood pressure at the ankle by the systolic blood pressure in the arm.

== Method ==
The patient must be placed supine, without the head or any extremities dangling over the edge of the table. Measuring ankle blood pressures while seated can overestimate the ABI by approximately 0.3.

A Doppler ultrasound blood flow detector, commonly called Doppler wand or Doppler probe, and a sphygmomanometer (blood pressure cuff) are usually used. The blood pressure cuff is inflated proximal to the artery in question. Measured by the Doppler wand, the inflation continues until the pulse in the artery ceases. The blood pressure cuff is then slowly deflated. When the artery's pulse is re-detected through the Doppler probe the pressure in the cuff at that moment indicates the systolic pressure of that artery.

The use of ordinary, readily available, oscillometric blood pressure meters to measure ankle blood pressure has been evaluated, using a cuff sized for the arm. The oscillometric ABI (OABI) was found to be feasible, shows reasonable correlation with the 'gold standard' Doppler ABI (DABI), and to detect DABI lower than 0.9 with moderate sensitivity and good specificity. Authors of a study concluded that "a patient with OABI lower than 0.9 is likely to have significant PAD and should be aggressively treated. The OABI is less useful in patients with absent peripheral pulses on physical examination", and commented that "Few physicians measure ABI because it is technically challenging and time consuming. Oscillometric blood pressure monitors are readily available and easy to use."

The higher systolic reading of the left and right arm brachial artery is generally used in the assessment. The pressures in each foot's posterior tibial artery and dorsalis pedis artery are measured with the higher of the two values used as the ABI for that leg.

$ABPI_{Leg} = \frac { P_{Leg} }{ P_{Arm} }$

Where P_{Leg} is the systolic blood pressure of dorsalis pedis or posterior tibial arteries
and P_{Arm} is the highest of the left and right arm brachial systolic blood pressure

The ABPI test is a popular tool for the non-invasive assessment of Peripheral vascular disease (PVD). Studies have shown the sensitivity of ABPI is 90% with a corresponding 98% specificity for detecting hemodynamically significant (stenosis of more than 50%) in major leg arteries, defined by angiogram.

However, ABPI has known issues:

- ABPI is known to be unreliable on patients with arterial calcification (hardening of the arteries) which results in less or incompressible arteries, as the stiff arteries produce falsely elevated ankle pressure, giving false negatives). This is often found in patients with diabetes mellitus (41% of patients with peripheral arterial disease (PAD) have diabetes), kidney failure or heavy smokers. ABPI values below 0.9 or above 1.3 should be investigated further regardless.
- Resting ABPI is insensitive to mild PAD. Treadmill tests (6 minute) are sometimes used to increase ABPI sensitivity, but this is unsuitable for patients who are obese or have co-morbidities such as aortic aneurysm, and increases assessment duration.
- Lack of protocol standardisation, which reduces intra-observer reliability.
- Skilled operators are required for consistent, accurate results.

When performed in an accredited diagnostic laboratory, the ABI is a fast, accurate, and painless exam, however these issues have rendered ABI unpopular in primary care offices and symptomatic patients are often referred to specialty clinics due to the perceived difficulties. Technology is emerging that allows for the oscillometric calculation of ABI, in which simultaneous readings of blood pressure at the levels of the ankle and upper arm are taken using specially calibrated oscillometric machines.

== Interpretation of results ==
In a normal subject the pressure at the ankle is slightly higher than at the elbow (there is reflection of the pulse pressure from the vascular bed of the feet, whereas at the elbow the artery continues on some distance to the wrist).

The ABPI is the ratio of the highest ankle to brachial artery pressure. An ABPI between and including 0.90 and 1.29 considered normal (free from significant PAD), while a lesser than 0.9 indicates arterial disease. An ABPI value of 1.3 or greater is also considered abnormal, and suggests calcification of the walls of the arteries and incompressible vessels, reflecting severe peripheral vascular disease.

Provided that there are no other significant conditions affecting the arteries of the leg, the following ABPI ratios can be used to predict the severity of PAD as well as assess the nature and best management of various types of leg ulcers. Studies also indicate that the assessment of PAD in people with diabetes should use both ABPI ratios and Doppler waveforms.

ABPI value	Interpretation	Action	Nature of ulcers, if present
1.3 and above	Abnormal; Vessel hardening from PVD	Refer or measure Toe pressure	Venous ulcer use full compression bandaging
1.0 - 1.2	Normal range	None	Venous ulcer use full compression bandaging
0.90 - 0.99	Acceptable	None	Venous ulcer use full compression bandaging
0.80 - 0.89	Some arterial disease	Manage risk factors	Venous ulcer use full compression bandaging
0.50 - 0.79	Moderate arterial disease	Routine specialist referral	Mixed ulcers use reduced compression bandaging
under 0.50	Severe arterial disease	Urgent specialist referral	Arterial ulcer no compression bandaging used

== Predictor of atherosclerosis mortality ==
Studies in 2006 suggests that an abnormal ABPI may be an independent predictor of mortality, as it reflects the burden of atherosclerosis. It thus has potential for screening for coronary artery disease, although no evidence-based recommendations can be made about screening in low-risk patients because clinical trials are lacking. It is noteworthy that abnormal values of ABI predispose to development of the frailty syndrome.

== See also ==
- Peripheral vascular examination
- Intermittent claudication
