= Pulmonary examination =

- Synonyms: Respiratory examination

The pulmonary examination or respiratory examination is the portion of the physical examination where the physician examines the respiratory system for signs of disease. It is performed as a part of a complete physical examination, or the physician may choose to perform a focused respiratory exam. Classically, it is performed after the HEENT examination, and consists of four stages: inspection, palpation, percussion, and auscultation. If there are signs of respiratory disease, the physician may order additional tests including medical imaging, such as a chest X-ray or CT scan, or laboratory tests, such as a complete blood count.

The information gathered from the physical examination, along with the medical history, is synthesized in order to produce a differential diagnosis and treatment plan.
