= Transmyocardial revascularization =

- Specialty: Cardiology

Transmyocardial laser revascularization (TMR) is a procedure used to treat inoperable heart disease in people with persistent angina that is not relieved by any other revascularization method.

Most people with coronary artery disease are treated with angioplasty and stenting or coronary bypass surgery and medications to improve blood flow to the heart muscle. The objective of each of these approaches is to increase blood flow through the coronary arteries to the heart. When these treatment options are exhausted, the patient is left with no viable surgical alternative other than, in limited cases, heart transplantation. Without a viable surgical alternative, the patient is generally managed with drug therapy, often with significant lifestyle limitations.

TMR, or transmyocardial laser revascularization, is a newer treatment aimed at improving blood flow to areas of the heart that were not treated by angioplasty or surgery.

== Procedures ==
TMR is a surgical procedure. It is performed through a small incision in the left side of the chest. Frequently, it is performed along with coronary bypass surgery, occasionally alone.

When performing TMR a qualified cardiac surgeon delivers a precise laser therapy (either with a Holmium:YAG laser or CO_{2}), directly to the target area(s) of the heart muscle. When performed as a primary therapy, it is done through a small incision between the ribs (thoracotomy) with the patient under general anesthesia. Transmyocardial laser revascularization (TMR) can also be performed as a secondary procedure in patients that have ischemic heart disease with areas of the heart that cannot be bypassed. The precise laser therapy is delivered to create small channels into the heart chamber. During a typical procedure, approximately 10 –50 channels are made in each targeted region of the heart muscle.

The channels in the heart muscle seal over almost immediately with little blood loss while the new channels allow fresh blood to perfuse the heart wall immediately.The CO_{2} Heart Laser uses a computer to direct laser beams to the appropriate area of the heart in between heartbeats, when the ventricle is filled with blood and the heart is relatively still.

== TMR demand ==
TMR is a treatment option for patients who:

- Have severe chest pain (angina), which limits the patient's daily activities or causes the patient to wake from pain at night, despite medications
- Have pre-operative tests that show ischemia
- Have a history of previous bypass surgery or angioplasty, and no further intervention is available.
- Have been told by their doctor that there is nothing that can be further done to help their symptoms.

TMR has shown positive clinical benefits for patients who may require one or two bypass grafts, yet also have other areas of the heart that are not able to be bypassed by direct bypass-surgery. This is often seen in patients with diabetes. The surgeon will bypass the targeted blockages and use the CO_{2} Heart Laser on the heart muscle with diffuse disease to achieve more complete blood flow to the heart.

TMR is not suitable for patients whose:

- Heart muscle is severely damaged due to heart attacks; the heart muscle is dead or scarred rather than affected by inadequate blood supply (ischemic)
- Heart muscle has no areas of ischemia
