= Peripheral artery disease =

Abnormal narrowing of arteries other than those that supply the heart or brain

- Other names: Peripheral vascular disease (PVD), peripheral artery occlusive disease, peripheral obliterative arteriopathy
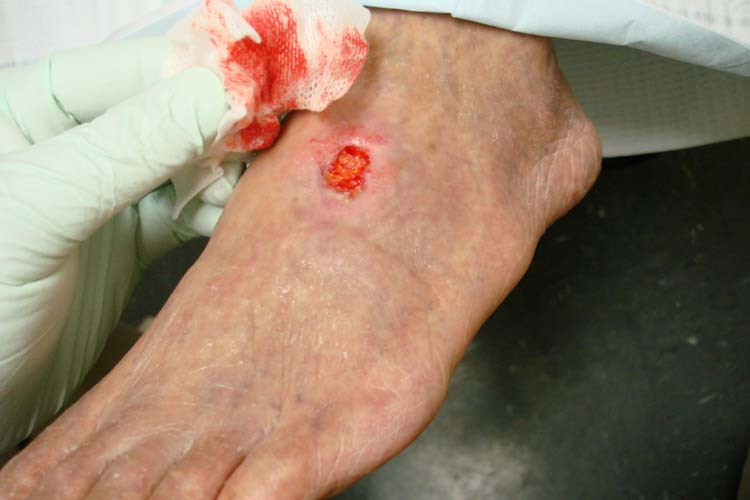
- An arterial insufficiency ulcer in a person with severe peripheral artery disease
- Specialty: Interventional radiology, vascular surgery
- Symptoms: Leg pain when walking that resolves with rest, skin ulcers, bluish skin, cold skin, loss of hair, unusually smooth or shiny skin
- Complications: Infection, amputation
- Causes: Atherosclerosis, artery spasm
- Risk factors: Cigarette smoking, diabetes, high blood pressure, high blood cholesterol.
- Diagnostic method: Ankle-brachial index < 0.90, duplex ultrasonography, angiography
- Treatment: Stopping smoking, supervised exercise therapy, surgery
- Medication: Statins, ACE inhibitors, cilostazol
- Frequency: 155 million (2015)
- Deaths: 52,500 (2015)

Peripheral artery disease (PAD) is a vascular disorder that causes abnormal narrowing of arteries other than those that supply the heart or brain. PAD may happen in any blood vessel, but it is more common in the legs than the arms.

When narrowing occurs in the heart, it is called coronary artery disease (CAD), and in the brain, it is called cerebrovascular disease. Peripheral artery disease in humans most commonly affects the legs, but other arteries also may be involved, such as those of the arms, neck, or kidneys.

Peripheral artery disease (PAD) is a form of peripheral vascular disease. Vascular refers to the arteries and veins within the body. PAD differs from peripheral veinous disease. PAD means the arteries are narrowed or blocked—the vessels that carry oxygen-rich blood as it moves from the heart to other parts of the body. Peripheral veinous disease, on the other hand, refers to problems with veins—the vessels that bring the blood back to the heart.

The classic symptom is leg pain when walking that resolves with rest and is known as intermittent claudication. Other symptoms include skin ulcers, bluish skin, cold skin, or abnormal nail and hair growth in the affected leg. Complications may include an infection or tissue death that may require amputation, coronary artery disease, or stroke. As many as 50% of people with PAD do not have symptoms.

The greatest risk factor for PAD is cigarette smoking. Other risk factors include diabetes, high blood pressure, kidney problems, and high blood cholesterol. PAD is primarily caused by the buildup of fatty plaque in the arteries that is called atherosclerosis, especially in individuals greater than 40 years of age. Additional risk factors include artery spasm, blood clots, trauma, fibromuscular dysplasia, and vasculitis. PAD is typically diagnosed by finding an ankle-brachial index (ABI) less than 0.90, which is the systolic blood pressure at the ankle divided by the systolic blood pressure of the arm. Duplex ultrasonography and angiography also may be used to make a diagnosis. Angiography is more accurate and allows for treatment at the same time, however, it is associated with greater risks.

It is unclear whether screening for peripheral artery disease in people without symptoms is useful, as it has not been properly studied. For those with intermittent claudication from PAD, stopping smoking and supervised exercise therapy may improve outcomes. Medications, including statins, ACE inhibitors, and cilostazol, may also help. Aspirin, which helps with thinning the blood and thus improving blood flow, does not appear to help those with mild disease, but is usually recommended for those with more significant disease due to the increased risk of heart attacks. Anticoagulants (blood thinners) such as warfarin show no definitive scientific evidence of benefit in PAD. Surgical procedures used to treat PAD include bypass grafting, angioplasty, and atherectomy.

In 2015, approximately 155 million people had PAD worldwide. It becomes more common with age. In the developed world, it affects about 5.3% of 45- to 50-year-olds and 18.6% of 85- to 90-year-olds. In the developing world, it affects 4.6% of people between the ages of 45 and 50 and 15% of people between the ages of 85 and 90. PAD in the developed world is equally common among men and women, although in the developing world, women are affected more commonly. In 2015, PAD resulted in about 52,500 deaths, which is an increase from the 16,000 deaths in 1990.

== Signs and symptoms ==
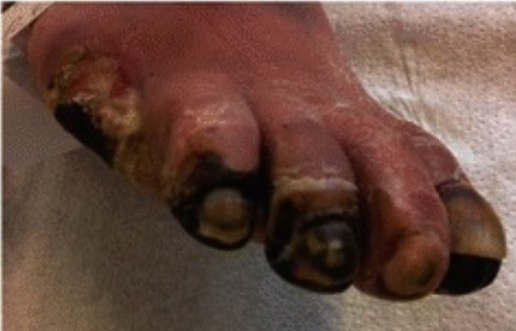
Peripheral arterial disease resulting in necrosis of multiple toes

The signs and symptoms of peripheral artery disease are based on the affected body part. Approximately 66% of patients affected by PAD either do not have symptoms or have atypical symptoms. The most common presenting symptom is intermittent claudication (IC), which typically refers to lower extremity skeletal muscle pain that occurs during exercise. IC presents when there is insufficient oxygen delivery to meet the metabolic requirements of the skeletal muscles. IC is a common manifestation of peripheral arterial disease (PAD). The pain is usually located in the calf muscles of the affected leg and is relieved by rest. This occurs because during exercise, the muscles require more oxygen. Normally, the arteries would be able to increase the amount of blood flow and therefore increase the amount of oxygen going to the exercised muscle. However, in PAD, the artery cannot respond appropriately to the increased muscular demand for oxygen. Therefore, the muscles are deprived of oxygen, leading to muscle pain that subsides with rest.

Other symptoms may include:

- Pain, aches, and/or cramps in the buttocks, hip, or thigh
- Muscle atrophy (muscle loss) of the affected limb
- Hair loss of the affected limb
- Skin that is smooth, shiny, or cool to the touch in the affected area
- Decreased or absent pulse in the feet
- Cold and/or numbness in the toes
- Sores or ulcers on the affected limb that do not heal

In individuals with severe PAD, complications may arise, including critical limb ischemia and gangrene. Critical limb ischemia occurs when the obstruction of blood flow in the artery is compromised to the point where the blood cannot maintain oxygenation of the tissue at rest. This may lead to pain at rest, a feeling of coldness, or numbness in the affected foot and toes. Other complications of severe PAD include lower limb tissue loss (amputation), arterial insufficiency ulcers, erectile dysfunction, and gangrene. People with diabetes are affected by gangrene of the feet at a rate that is 30 times higher than the unaffected population. Many of these severe complications, such as those leading to amputation, are irreversible.

== Causes ==
=== Risk factors ===
The illustration shows how PAD may affect the legs' arteries. Figure A shows a normal artery with normal blood flow. The inset image shows a cross-section of the normal artery. Figure B shows an artery with plaque buildup partially blocking blood flow. The inset image shows a cross-section of the narrowed artery.

Factors contributing to an increased risk of PAD are the same as those for atherosclerosis. These include age, gender, and ethnicity. PAD is twice as common in males as in females. In terms of ethnicity, PAD is more common in people identified as non-Caucasian in a 2:1 ratio. The factors with the greatest risk associations are hyperlipidemia, hypertension, diabetes mellitus, chronic kidney disease, and smoking. Presenting three or more of these factors increases the risk of developing PAD tenfold.

- Smoking – Tobacco use in any form is the single greatest risk factor for peripheral artery disease internationally. Smokers have up to a 10-fold increase in the risk of PAD in a dose-response relationship. Exposure to second-hand smoke also has been shown to promote changes in the lining of blood vessels (endothelium), which may lead to atherosclerosis. Smokers are 2–3 times more likely to have lower extremity PAD than coronary artery disease. Greater than 80%–90% of patients with lower extremity peripheral arterial disease are current or former smokers. The risk of PAD increases with the number of cigarettes smoked per day and the number of years smoked.
- High blood sugar – Diabetes mellitus is shown to increase the risk of PAD by 2–4 fold. It does this by causing endothelial and smooth-muscle cell dysfunction in peripheral arteries. The risk of developing lower extremity peripheral arterial disease is proportional to the severity and duration of diabetes.
- High blood cholesterol – Dyslipidemia is an unhealthy pattern of cholesterol or fat in the blood. Dyslipidemia is characterized by a high level of a protein called low-density lipoprotein (LDL cholesterol), low levels of high-density lipoprotein (HDL cholesterol), elevation of total cholesterol, and/or high triglyceride levels. This abnormality in blood cholesterol levels has been correlated with accelerated peripheral artery disease. Management of dyslipidemia by diet, exercise, and/or medication is associated with a major reduction in rates of heart attack and stroke.
- High blood pressure – Hypertension or elevated blood pressure may increase a person's risk of developing PAD. Similarly to PAD, there is a known association between high blood pressure and heart attacks, strokes, and abdominal aortic aneurysms. High blood pressure increases the risk of intermittent claudication, the most common symptom of PAD, by 2.5- to 4-fold in men and women, respectively.
- Other risk factors that are being studied include levels of various inflammatory mediators such as C-reactive protein, fibrinogen, homocysteine, and lipoprotein A. Individuals with increased levels of homocysteine in their blood have a 2-fold risk of developing peripheral artery disease. While there are genetic factors leading to risk factors for peripheral artery disease, including diabetes and high blood pressure, there have been no specific genes or gene mutations directly associated with the development of peripheral artery disease.

=== High risk populations ===
Peripheral arterial disease is more common in these populations:

- All people who have leg symptoms with exertion (suggestive of claudication) or ischemic rest pain
- All people aged 65 years and older, regardless of risk factor status
- All people between 50 and 69 who have a cardiovascular risk factor (particularly diabetes or smoking)
- Age less than 50 years, with diabetes and one other atherosclerosis risk factor (smoking, dyslipidemia, hypertension, or hyperhomocysteinemia)
- Individuals with an abnormal lower extremity pulse examination
- Those with known atherosclerotic coronary, carotid, or renal artery disease
- All people with a Framingham risk score of 10%–20%
- All people who previously have experienced chest pain

== Etiology and pathophysiology ==
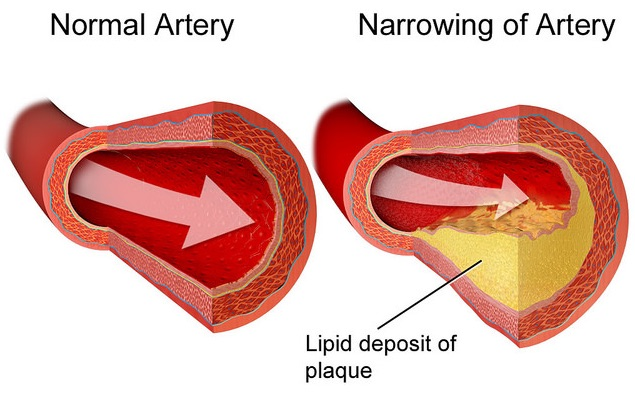
Illustration of how the buildup of lipids cause a blockage of blood flow to the portion of the artery below the narrowing

Peripheral arterial disease is considered to be a set of chronic or acute syndromes, generally derived from the presence of occlusive arterial disease that causes inadequate blood flow to the limbs.

As previously mentioned, the most common etiology of peripheral artery disease, especially in patients greater than 40 years old, is atherosclerosis. Atherosclerosis is a narrowing of the arteries caused by lipid or fat buildup or by calcium deposition in the wall of the affected arteries.

The pathophysiology of atherosclerosis involves complex interactions between cholesterol and vascular cells. In the early stages of PAD, the arteries compensate for plaque buildup by dilating to preserve flow through the vessel. Eventually, the artery cannot dilate further, and the atherosclerotic plaque narrows the arterial flow lumen.

When there is an imbalance between the needs of the peripheral tissues and the blood supply, the affected person is faced with ischemia.

From the pathophysiologic point of view, a restriction of blood supply (ischemia) to the lower limbs may be classified as either functional or critical. Functional ischemia occurs when the blood flow is normal at rest, but insufficient during exercise, presenting clinically as intermittent claudication. Critical ischemia is produced when the reduction in blood flow results in a perfusion deficit at rest and is defined by the presence of pain at rest or trophic lesions in the legs. In this situation, precise diagnosis is crucial, as there is a clear risk of limb loss if adequate blood flow is not re-established, either by surgery or endovascular therapy. Differentiating between functional and critical ischemia is important to establish the therapeutic indication and the prognosis in patients with PAD.

Other causes include vasculitis and in situ thrombosis related to hypercoagulable states. Additional mechanisms of peripheral artery disease include arterial spasm and fibromuscular dysplasia. The cause and pathophysiology of arterial spasm are not fully understood, but it is hypothesized that they may occur secondary to trauma. The symptoms of claudication ensue when the artery spasms, or clamps down on itself, creating an obstruction. Like atherosclerosis, this leads to decreased blood flow to the tissue downstream of the obstruction. Thrombosis, or the formation of a blood clot, usually occurs due to stasis or trauma.

== Diagnosis ==
Measuring the ankle-brachial index

Diagnosing or identifying peripheral artery disease requires a history of symptoms and a physical exam, followed by confirmatory testing. These tests could include CT scans (Computed Tomographic Angiography), MRA scans (Magnetic Resonance Angiography), or ultrasounds for imaging. A physician will examine an individual for specific exam findings if symptoms are consistent with peripheral artery disease. Abnormal physical exam findings may lead a healthcare provider to consider the diagnosis. However, to confirm a diagnosis, confirmatory testing is required.

These findings are associated with peripheral artery disease:

- Decreased or absent pulses
- Muscle atrophy or wasting
- Noticeable blueness of the affected limb
- Decreased temperature (coolness) in the affected limb when compared to the other limb
- Thickened nails
- Smooth or shiny skin and hair loss
- Buerger's test is a check for pallor when the affected limb is in an elevated position. The limb is then moved from an elevated to a sitting position and checked for redness that is called reactive hyperemia. Buerger's test is an assessment of arterial sufficiency, which is the ability of the artery to supply oxygenated blood to the tissue that it serves.
- Nonhealing lower extremity wound

If peripheral artery disease is suspected, the initial study is the ankle–brachial index (ABI). The ABI is a simple, non-invasive test that measures the ratio of systolic blood pressure in the ankle to the systolic blood pressure in the upper arm. This is based on the idea that if blood pressure readings in the ankle are lower than those in the arm, a blockage in the arteries that provide blood from the heart to the ankle is suspected. An ABI range of 0.90 to 1.40 is considered normal. A person is considered to have PAD when the ABI is ≤ 0.90. However, PAD may be graded further as mild to moderate if the ABI is between 0.41 and 0.90, and severe if the ABI is less than 0.40. These categories may provide insight into the disease course. Furthermore, ABI values of 0.91 to 0.99 are considered borderline, and values >1.40 indicate noncompressible arteries. If an ABI >1.40 is calculated, this could indicate vessel wall stiffness caused by calcification, which may occur in people with uncontrolled diabetes. Abnormally high ABIs (>1.40) are usually considered false negatives, and thus, such results merit further investigation and higher-level studies. Individuals with noncompressible arteries have an increased risk of cardiovascular mortality within two years.

Individuals with suspected PAD with normal ABIs may undergo exercise testing for ABI. A baseline ABI is obtained before exercise. The patient is then asked to exercise (usually patients are made to walk on a treadmill at a constant speed) until claudication pain occurs (for a maximum of 5 minutes), after which the ankle pressure is again measured. A decrease in ABI of 15%–20% would be diagnostic of PAD.

If ABIs are abnormal, generally the next step is a lower limb Doppler ultrasound to look at the site of obstruction and the extent of atherosclerosis. Other imaging may be performed by angiography, where a catheter is inserted into the common femoral artery and selectively guided to the artery in question. While injecting a radio-dense contrast agent, an X-ray is taken. Any blood flow-limiting blockage found in the X-ray may be identified and treated by procedures including atherectomy, angioplasty, or stenting. Contrast angiography is the most readily available and widely used imaging technique. Modern computerized tomography (CT) scanners provide direct imaging of the arterial system. Studies have shown the sensitivity and specificity of CT in identifying lesions with >50% stenosis to be 95% and 96%, respectively. As such, CT may be considered as an alternative to invasive angiography. An important distinction between the two is that, unlike invasive angiography, assessment of the arterial system with CT does not allow for vascular intervention.

Magnetic resonance angiography (MRA) is a noninvasive diagnostic procedure that uses a combination of a large magnet, radio frequencies, and a computer to produce detailed images of blood vessels inside the body. The advantages of MRA include its safety and ability to provide high-resolution, three-dimensional imaging of the entire abdomen, pelvis, and lower extremities in one sitting.

=== Classification ===
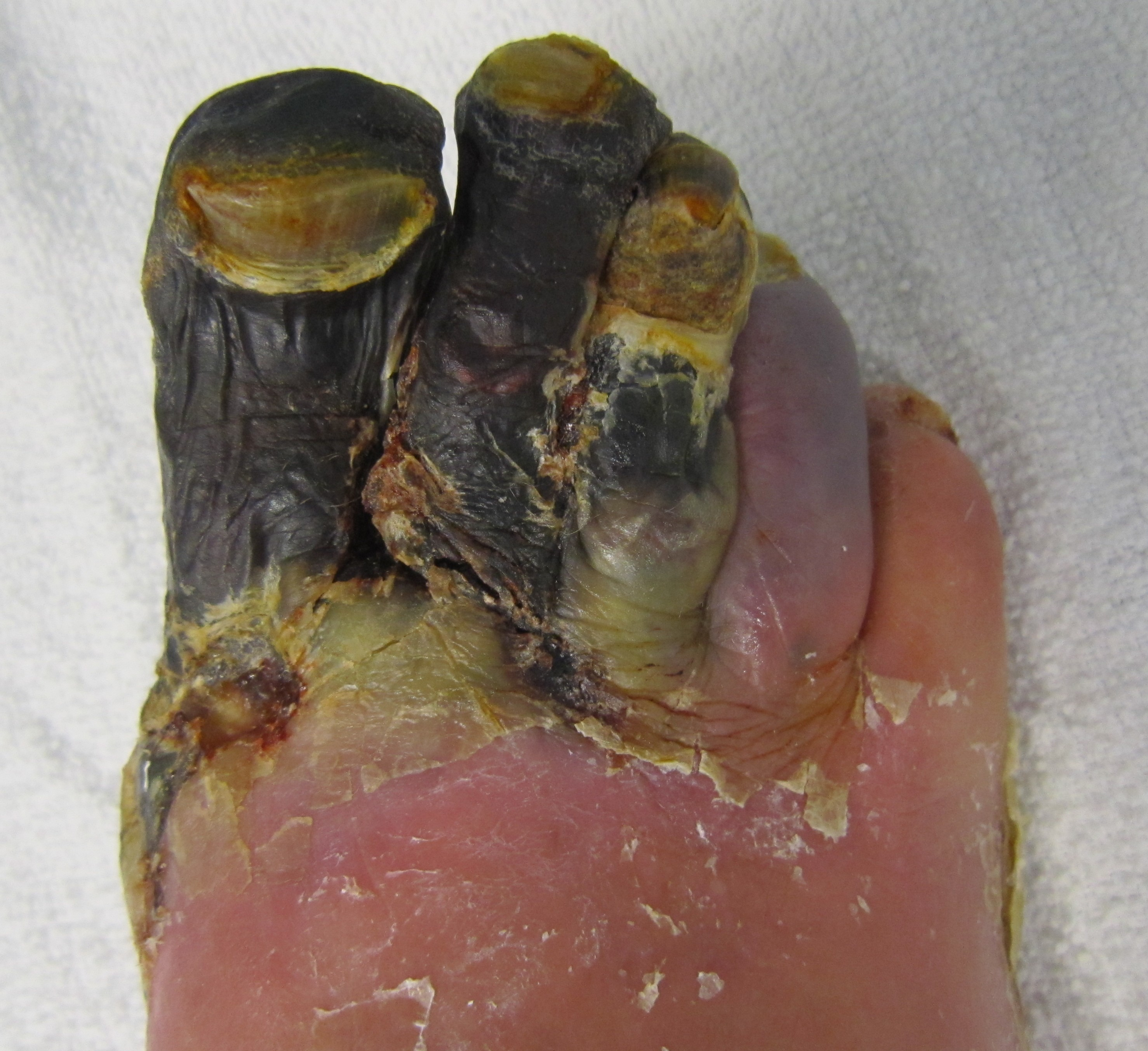
Gangrene of three toes resulting from peripheral artery disease

The two most commonly used methods to classify peripheral artery disease are the Fontaine and Rutherford classification systems. The Fontaine stages were introduced by René Fontaine in 1954 to define the severity of chronic limb ischemia:

- Stage I: asymptomatic
- Stage IIa: intermittent claudication after walking a distance of more than 200 meters
- Stage IIb: intermittent claudication after walking a distance of less than 200 meters
- Stage III: rest pain
- Stage IV: ulcers or gangrene of the limb

The Rutherford classification was created by the Society for Vascular Surgery and the International Society of Cardiovascular Surgery, introduced in 1986 and revised in 1997 (and known as the Rutherford classification after the lead author, Robert B. Rutherford). This classification system consists of four grades and seven categories (categories 0–6):

- Grade 0, Category 0: asymptomatic
- Grade I, Category 1: mild claudication
- Grade I, Category 2: moderate claudication
- Grade I, Category 3: severe claudication
- Grade II, Category 4: rest pain
- Grade III, Category 5: minor tissue loss; ischemic ulceration not exceeding the ulcer of the digits of the foot
- Grade IV, Category 6: major tissue loss; severe ischemic ulcers or frank gangrene

Moderate to severe PAD, classified by Fontaine's stages III to IV or Rutherford's categories 4 to 5, presents a limb threat (risk of limb loss) in the form of critical limb ischemia.

In 2013, the Society for Vascular Surgery published a classification system based on "wound, ischemia, and foot infection" (WIfI). This classification system was created to account for the demographic changes that have occurred over the past forty years, including the increased incidence of high blood sugar and evolving techniques and abilities for revascularization. This system was created on the basis that ischemia and angiographic disease patterns are not the sole determinants of amputation risk. The WIfI classification system is broken up into two parts: wounds and ischemia. Wounds are graded 0 through 3 based on the presence of ulceration, gangrene, and ischemia.

- Grade 0: no ulcer, no gangrene
- Grade 1: small, shallow ulcer; no gangrene
- Grade 2: deep ulcer with exposed tendon or bone, gangrene limited to toes
- Grade 3: extensive, full-thickness ulcer; gangrene extending to the forefoot or midfoot

Ischemia is graded 0 through 3 based on ABI, ankle systolic pressure, and toe pressure.

- Grade 0: ABI ≥0.80, ankle systolic pressure ≥100 mm Hg, toe pressure ≥60 mm Hg
- Grade 1: arterial brachial index 0.6 to 0.79, ankle systolic pressure 70 to 100 mm Hg, toe pressure 40 to 59 mm Hg
- Grade 2: ABI 0.4–0.59, ankle systolic pressure 50 to 70 mm Hg, toe pressure 30 to 39 mm Hg
- Grade 3: ABI ≤0.39, ankle systolic pressure <50 mm Hg, toe pressure <30 mm Hg

The TASC (and TASC II) classification suggests PAD treatment is based on the severity of the disease seen on an angiogram.

=== Screening ===
It is unclear whether screening for disease in the general population is useful, as it has not been extensively studied. This includes screening with the ankle-brachial index (ABI), although a systematic review of the literature did not support the use of routine ABI screening in asymptomatic patients.

Testing for coronary artery disease or carotid artery disease is of unclear benefit. While PAD is a risk factor for abdominal aortic aneurysms (AAA), there is no data on screening individuals with asymptomatic PAD for abdominal aortic aneurysms. For people with symptomatic PAD, screening by ultrasound for AAA is not unreasonable.

=== Wearable devices and remote patient monitoring ===
A 2022 review found that a variety of wearable medical devices measuring different parameters (such as body temperature) were being combined with remote patient monitoring of PAD patients, to improve health outcomes.

Some studies propose the development of devices measuring oxygen continuously during exercise. This is because resting perfusion and metabolic activity are extremely low, and differences between non-patients and PAD patients are barely measurable. As such, testing of vascular function and energetics requires a physiological challenge. Pulse oximeters can be inconvenient to wear during exercise and only give oxygen values at discrete time points, nor is there sufficient evidence to support any use in identifying PAD. Some publications and studies therefore discuss the use of wearable sensors measuring oxygen levels continuously in PAD patients, such as through transcutaneous means. However, because transcutaneous measurements are affected by movement (such as during exercise) and body temperature, the use of oxygen sensors that are inserted subcutaneously as opposed to transcutaneously may most effectively help monitor a PAD patient's progress and direct therapy decisions. To date, one oxygen sensing system has been approved for use in Europe to measure tissue perfusion in all PAD patients.

== Treatment ==
Depending on the severity of the disease, these steps can be taken, according to these guidelines:

=== Lifestyle ===
- Smoking cessation (smoking promotes PAD and is a risk factor for cardiovascular disease)
- Regular exercise for those with claudication helps open up alternative small vessels (collateral flow), and the person's activity tolerance often improves. Treadmill exercise (30 to 60 minutes of treadmill or track walking, in an exercise-rest-exercise pattern, at least 3 times per week) has been reviewed as another treatment with several positive outcomes, including a reduction in cardiovascular events and improved quality of life. Supervised exercise programs increase pain-free walking time and maximum walking distance in people with PAD.

=== Medication ===
- Management of diabetes
- Management of hypertension
- Management of high cholesterol, and antiplatelet drugs such as aspirin and clopidogrel. Statins reduce clot formation and cholesterol levels, respectively, and can help with disease progression and address the other cardiovascular risks that the affected person is likely to have.

According to guidelines, taking aspirin or clopidogrel is recommended to reduce myocardial infarction ("heart attack"), stroke, and other causes of vascular death in people with symptomatic peripheral artery disease. It is recommended that aspirin and clopidogrel be taken alone and not in conjunction with one another (i.e., not as dual antiplatelet therapy). The recommended daily dosage of aspirin for treating PAD is between 75 and 325 mg, while the recommended daily dosage for clopidogrel is 75 mg. The effectiveness of both aspirin and clopidogrel to reduce the risk of cardiovascular ischemic events in people with symptomatic PAD is not well established. Research also suggests that low-dose rivaroxaban plus aspirin is effective as a new anti-thrombotic regimen for PAD.

Cilostazol can improve symptoms in some people. Pentoxifylline is of unclear benefit. Cilostazol may improve walking distance for people who experience claudication due to peripheral artery disease, but no strong evidence suggests that it improves the quality of life, decreases mortality, or decreases the risk of cardiovascular events.

Treatment with other drugs or vitamins is unsupported by clinical evidence, "but trials evaluating the effect of folate and vitamin B_{12} on hyperhomocysteinemia, a putative vascular risk factor, are near completion".

=== Revascularization ===
After a trial of the best medical treatment outlined above, if symptoms persist, patients may be referred to a vascular or endovascular surgeon. The benefit of revascularization is thought to correspond to the severity of ischemia and the presence of other risk factors for limb loss, such as wound and infection severity.

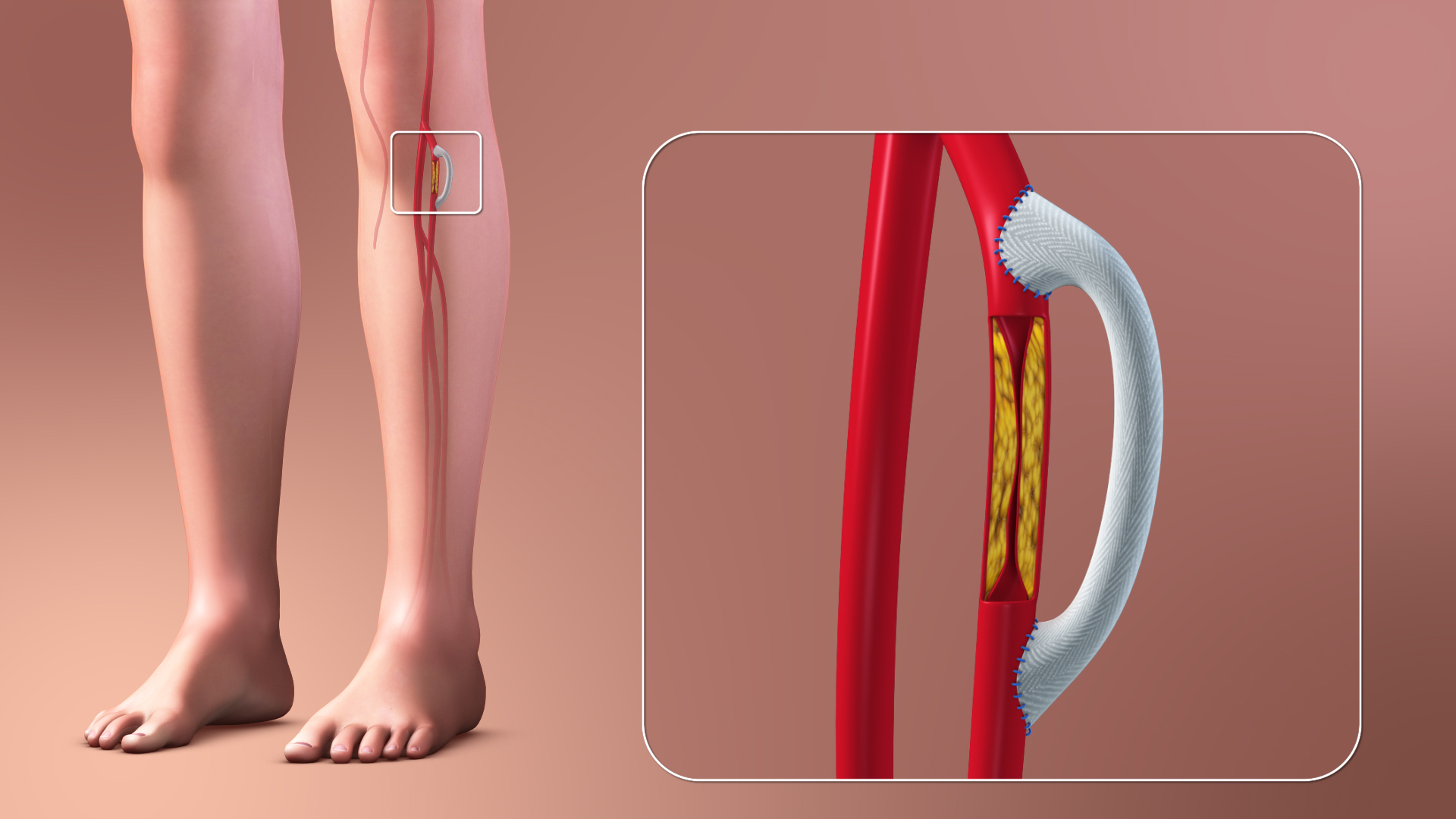
- 3D Medical Animation still shot depicting the Vascular Bypass Grafting
  Angioplasty (or percutaneous transluminal angioplasty) can be done on solitary lesions in large arteries, such as the femoral artery, but may not have sustained benefits. Patency rates following angioplasty are highest for iliac arteries and decrease with arteries towards the toes. Other criteria that affect the outcome following revascularization are the length of the lesion and the number of lesions. There do not appear to be any long-term advantages or sustained benefits to placing a stent following angioplasty in order to hold the narrowing of the subsartorial artery open.
- Atherectomy, in which the plaque is scraped off the inside of the vessel wall (albeit with no better results than angioplasty).
- Vascular bypass grafting can be performed to circumvent a diseased area of the arterial vasculature. The great saphenous vein is used as a conduit if available, although artificial (Gore-Tex or PTFE) material is often used for long grafts when an adequate venous conduit is unavailable.
- When gangrene has set in, amputation may be required to prevent infected tissues from causing sepsis, a life-threatening illness.
- Thrombolysis and thrombectomy are used in cases of arterial thrombosis or embolism.
- shockwave intravascular lithotripsy, a minimally invasive method that uses ultrasound waves to break up plaque within the artery without the need for penetration. The method was first approved by the US Food and Drug Administration in February 2021, and has been used as a complement to more widely used methods of atherectomy.

=== Guidelines ===
A guideline from the American College of Cardiology and American Heart Association for the diagnosis and treatment of lower extremity, renal, mesenteric, and abdominal aortic PAD was compiled in 2013, combining the 2005 and 2011 guidelines. For chronic limb-threatening ischemia, the ACCF/AHA guidelines recommend balloon angioplasty only for people with a life expectancy of 2 years or less or those who do not have an autogenous vein available. For those with a life expectancy greater than 2 years or who have an autogenous vein, bypass surgery is recommended.

== Prognosis ==
Individuals with PAD have an "exceptionally elevated risk for cardiovascular events and the majority will eventually die of a cardiac or cerebrovascular etiology". Prognosis is correlated with the severity of the PAD as measured by an ABI. Large-vessel PAD increases mortality from cardiovascular disease significantly. PAD carries a greater than "20% risk of a coronary event in 10 years".

The risk is low that an individual with claudication will develop severe ischemia and require amputation, but the risk of death from coronary events is three to four times higher than that of matched controls without claudication. Of patients with intermittent claudication, only "7% will undergo lower-extremity bypass surgery, 4% major amputations, and 16% worsening claudication", but stroke and heart attack events are elevated, and the "5-year mortality rate is estimated to be 30% (versus 10% in controls)".

== Epidemiology ==
The prevalence of PAD in the general population is 3–7%, affecting up to 20% of those over 70; 70%–80% of affected individuals are asymptomatic; only a minority ever require revascularization or amputation. Peripheral artery disease affects one in three diabetics over the age of 50. In the US, it affects 12–20 percent of Americans age 65 and older. Around 10 million Americans have PAD. Despite its prevalence and implications for cardiovascular risk, there are still low levels of awareness of risk factors and symptoms, with 26% of the population in the US reported to have knowledge of PAD.

In 2000, among people aged 40 years and older in the United States, rates of PAD were 4.3%. Rates were 14.5% for people aged 70 years or over. Within age groups, rates were generally higher for women than men. Non-Hispanic blacks had a rate of 7.9% compared to 4.4% in Non-Hispanic whites and 3.0% (1.4%–4.6%) in Mexican Americans.

The incidence of symptomatic PAD increases with age, from about 0.3% per year for men aged 40–55 years to about 1% per year for men aged over 75 years. The prevalence of PAD varies considerably depending on how PAD is defined and the age of the population being studied. People diagnosed with PAD have a greater risk of a MACE (Major Adverse Cardiac Event) and stroke. Their risk of developing a reinfarction, stroke, or transient ischemic attack within one year following a heart attack increases to 22.9%, compared to 11.4% for those without PAD.

The Diabetes Control and Complications Trial and the UK Prospective Diabetes Study trials in people with type 1 and type 2 diabetes, respectively, demonstrated that glycemic control is more strongly associated with microvascular disease than macrovascular disease. Pathologic changes occurring in small vessels may be more sensitive to chronically elevated glucose levels than atherosclerosis occurring in larger arteries.

== Research ==
Research is being done on therapies to prevent the progression of PAD. In those who have developed critically poor blood flow to the legs, the benefit of autotransplantation of autologous mononuclear cells is unclear.

Only one randomized controlled trial has been conducted comparing vascular bypass to angioplasty for the treatment of severe PAD. The trial found no difference in amputation-free survival between vascular bypass and angioplasty at the planned clinical endpoint, but the trial has been criticized as being underpowered, limiting endovascular options, and comparing inappropriate endpoints. As of 2017, two randomized clinical trials are being conducted to better understand the optimal revascularization technique for severe PAD and critical limb ischemia (CLI), the BEST-CLI (Best Endovascular Versus Best Surgical Therapy for Patients With Critical Limb Ischemia) Trial and the BASIL-2 (Bypass Versus Angioplasty in Severe Ischaemia of the Leg – 2 )Trial.

In 2011, pCMV-vegf165 was registered in Russia as the first-in-class gene therapy drug for the treatment of PAD, including the advanced stage of critical limb ischemia.
