= Atherectomy =

Surgical removal of atherosclerosis from the walls of arteries

- Illustration of three types of atherectomy devices being used to remove plaque in a blood vessel
- Specialty: Cardiology
- ICD-9-CM: 39.50, 00.61 -00.62
- MeSH: D017073

Atherectomy is a minimally invasive technique for removing atherosclerosis from blood vessels within the body. It is an alternative to angioplasty for the treatment of peripheral artery disease, but the studies that exist are not adequate to determine whether it is superior to angioplasty. It has also been used to treat coronary artery disease, albeit without evidence of superiority to angioplasty.

== Uses ==
Atherectomy is used to treat narrowing in arteries caused by peripheral artery disease and coronary artery disease.

== Controversy ==
The use of atherectomy instead of or in addition to angioplasty remains an area of controversy, as atherectomy typically involves the use of more costly disposable devices, and clear evidence to justify its use is lacking. Atherectomy has high physician reimbursement relative to angioplasty alone. According to The New York Times, 'Medical device makers have bankrolled a cottage industry of doctors and clinics that perform artery-clearing procedures that can lead to amputations.'

== Technique ==
Unlike angioplasty and stents, which push plaque into the vessel wall, atherectomy cuts plaque from the wall of the artery. While atherectomy is usually employed to treat arteries it can be used in veins and vascular bypass grafts as well.

Atherectomy falls under the general category of percutaneous revascularization, which implies re-canalizing blocked vasculature via a needle puncture in the skin. The most common access point is near the groin through the common femoral artery (CFA). Other common places are the brachial artery, radial artery, popliteal artery, dorsalis pedis, and others.

There are four types of atherectomy devices: orbital, rotational, laser, and directional.

The decision to use which type of device is made by the interventionist, based on a number of factors. They include the type of lesion being treated, the physician's experience with each device, and interpretation of the devices' risks and effectiveness, based on a review of the medical literature.

Directional atherectomy is an intravascular procedure guided by optical coherence tomography termed as lumivascular atherectomy.

== See also ==
- Interventional radiology
