= Arterial insufficiency ulcer =

Skin sore on the hands and feet due to insufficient blood flow

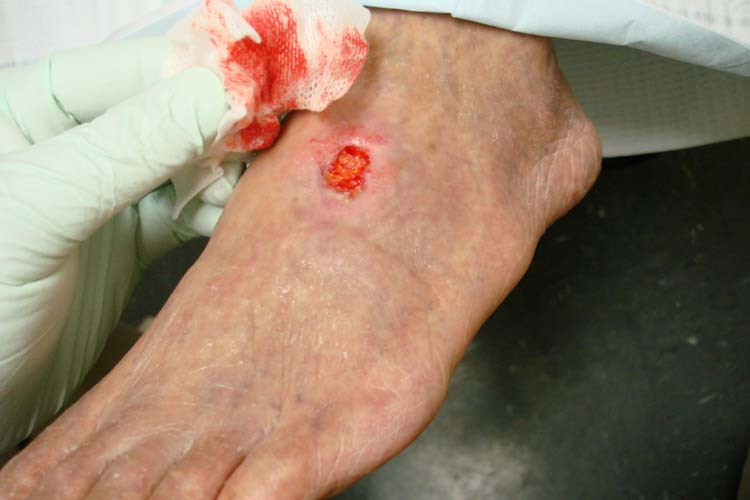
- A 71-year-old diabetic male smoker with severe peripheral arterial disease presented with a dorsal foot ulceration (2.5 cm X 2.4cm) that had been chronically open for nearly 2 years.

Arterial insufficiency ulcers (also known as ischemic ulcers, or ischemic wounds) are ulcers most often located on the lateral surface of the ankle or the distal digits. They are commonly caused by peripheral artery disease (PAD).

== Characteristics ==
Arterial insufficiency ulcers have a "punched-out" appearance, sometimes extending as deep as the tendons. They are intensely painful especially at night when sleeping. They have a gray or yellow fibrotic base and undermining skin margins. Pulses in the area are not palpable. Associated skin changes may be observed, such as thin, shiny skin and absence of hair. Lower-limb ulcers are most common on the distal ends. A special type of ischemic ulcer that develops in the duodenum after severe burns is called Curling's ulcer.

== Cause ==
The ulcers are caused by lack of blood flow to the capillary beds of the lower extremities. Most often endothelial dysfunction is a causative factor in diabetic microangiopathy and macroangiopathy. In microangiopathy, neuropathy and autoregulation of capillaries lead to poor perfusion of tissues, especially in the wound base. When pressure is placed on the skin, the skin is damaged and is unable to be repaired due to the lack of blood perfusing the tissue.

== Diagnosis ==
Arterial doppler and pulse volume recordings are performed for baseline assessment of blood flow. Radiographs may be necessary to rule out osteomyelitis.

=== Differential diagnoses ===
- Neuropathic ulcer
- Gangrene
- Infected wound

== Management ==
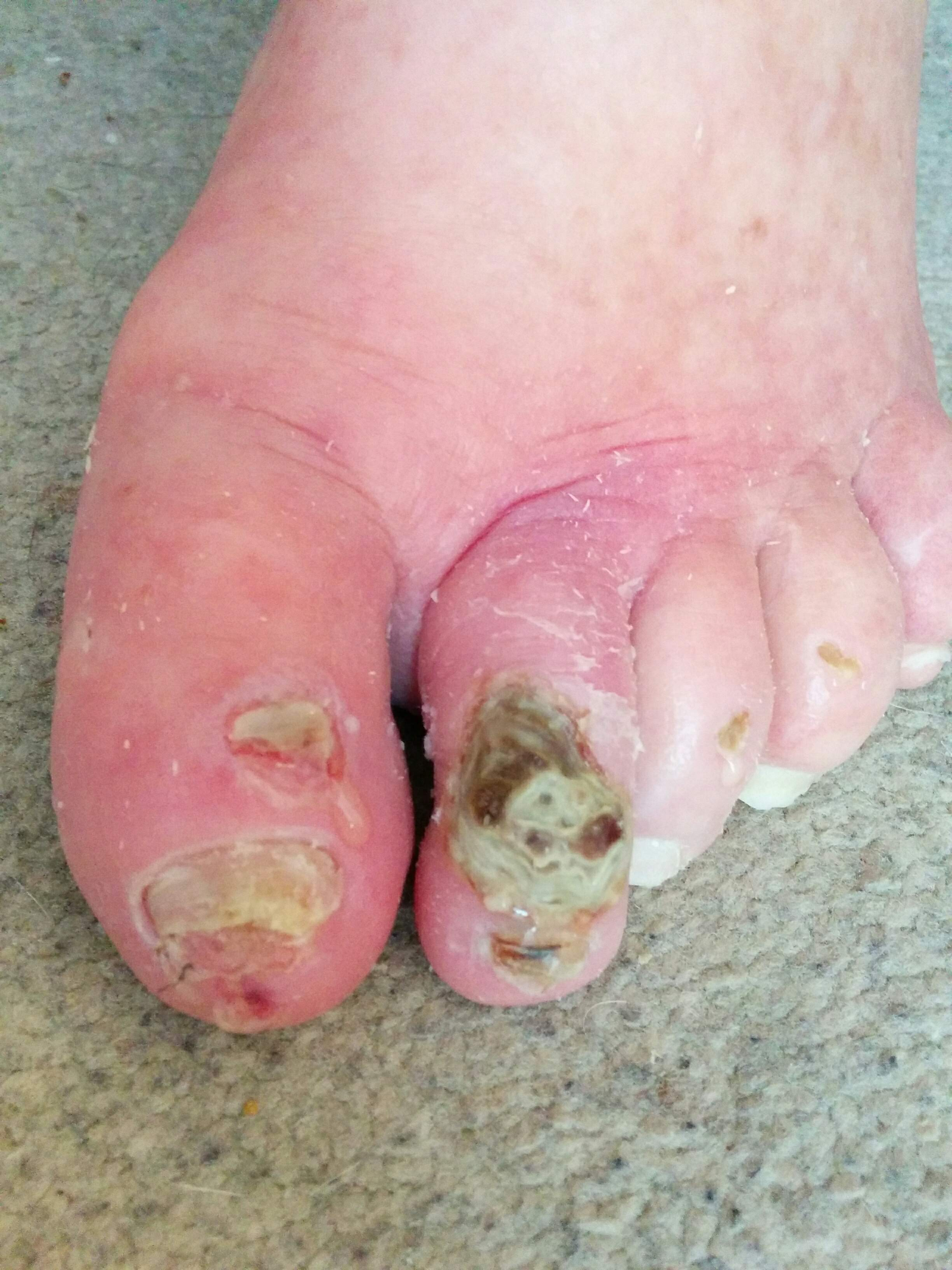
Foot of an 80-year old individual diagnosed with type 2 diabetes and heart failure. The second toe has a large ischemic ulcer. The first toe has a small one.

The prevalence of arterial insufficiency ulcers among people with diabetes is high due to decreased blood flow caused by the thickening of arteries and lack of sensation due to diabetic neuropathy. Prevention is the first step in avoiding the development of an arterial insufficiency ulcer. Preventative steps could include annual podiatry check-ups that include, "assessment of skin, checking of pedal pulses (assessing for blood flow) and assessing physical sensation". The management of arterial insufficiency ulcers depends on the severity of the underlying arterial insufficiency. The affected region can sometimes be revascularized via vascular bypass or angioplasty. If bacterial infection is present, appropriate antibiotics are prescribed. After proper blood flow is established, debridement of necrosed tissue is performed. If the wound is plantar (on the walking surface of foot), the patient is advised to avoid bearing weight on the foot to avoid irritation and enlargement of the ulcer. Proper glycemic control is important for diabetic patients. Smoking should be avoided to aid wound healing.

== Epidemiology ==
These ulcers are difficult to heal via basic wound care and often require advanced therapy, such as hyperbaric oxygen therapy or bioengineered skin substitutes. If not addressed promptly, risks of complications such as infection increase, and the affected limb eventually may require amputation. Individuals with a history of previous ulcerations are 36 times more likely to develop another ulcer.

== See also ==
- Peripheral artery disease
- Venous insufficiency ulceration
- List of cutaneous conditions
