= Transcutaneous oxygen measurement =

- Purpose: measuring oxygen level of tissue below skin

Typical measurement sites for TcpO2

Transcutaneous oxygen measurement (TcpO2 or TCOM) is a noninvasive method for measuring the partial pressure of oxygen diffusing through the skin. TcpO2 can be used as an indirect measure of tissue oxygenation. As wounds require oxygen to heal, understanding tissue oxygenation is important for wound healing, and TcpO2 can be used to gauge the ability of tissue to effectively heal.

TcpO2 is made possible through Clark-type electrodes that can measure the pressure of oxygen released through the skin. A fixation ring placed at the measurement site holds the electrode in place throughout the measurement. The electrode heats the skin to increase blood flow at the site. Typically, it takes about 15 minutes for the body to reach a stable maximum level of oxygen diffusion — producing a reliable TcpO2 baseline measurement in millimeters of mercury (mmHg).

According to the Global Vascular Guidelines wound complications increase as TcpO2 levels fall below 40 mmHg.

Many factors can limit the accuracy of the test including edema, temperature, inflammation, medications, and stress. In addition for the measurement to be normal, all parts of the oxygenation pathway must be functioning: the lungs must be able to oxygenate the blood, the heart must be able to pump the blood, and a patent artery must be able to carry blood to the skin.

== Application areas for TcpO2 ==
The primary applications of TcpO2 are assessing vascular diseases such as peripheral artery disease (PAD), evaluating wound-healing potential, establishing the effectiveness of revascularization surgery, and in hyperbaric oxygen therapy (HBOT). TcpO2 is a viable alternative to toe pressure for people with amputated toes and ankle pressure for patients with non-compressible ankles.

Without comorbidities, wounds are thought to be able to heal if TcpO2 is greater than 40 mmHg. In the presence of comorbidities, such as diabetes or edema, a higher value is likely needed. Patients with TcpO2 values below 20 mmHg are likely to need revascularization to promote adequate wound healing.

One study suggests that angiosome-guided TcpO2 contributes to predicting successful foot ulcer healing. For example, comparing TcpO2 measurements in areas adjacent to a non-healing ulcer with measurements from additional sites can reveal microcirculatory deficiencies.

=== TcpO2 and hyperbaric oxygen therapy ===
TcpO2 can be measured during hyperbaric oxygen therapy (HBOT), which is a useful way to assess the treatment's effectiveness. If the in-chamber TcpO2 value of a person with diabetic foot is greater than 200 mmHg, the patient will likely benefit, but if it’s less than 100 mmHg, HBOT is considered ineffective

People with critical limb-threatening ischemia will almost always produce TcpO2 values below 30 mmHg and usually less than 20 mmHg Edema, inflammation, or temporarily constricted blood vessels due to cold, dehydration, or pain can, however, result in low TcpO2 values. Interpretation of TcpO2 values should be made in the context of the patient’s clinical history and condition at the time of testing.

Microvascular disease can also result in low TcpO2 values, as seen in patients with diabetes. Isolated low values in tissue at the edge of a wound (with normal distal values) can be caused by local constriction, inability to form new blood vessels, or some other process confined to the wound.

==== Provocations and challenges ====
In addition to the baseline, TcpO2 with provocation provides more information about microcirculation status. Commonly used techniques include oxygen challenge tests and leg elevation/lowering.

==== Oxygen challenge ====
In an oxygen challenge, the patient breathes 100% oxygen. According to Fife et al. an oxygen challenge is the best way to determine whether low baseline TcpO2 values (under 30 mmHg) are due to macrovascular arterial disease or a temporary diffusion barrier — such as edema or inflammation. People with a baseline TcpO2 below 30 mmHg and above 100 mmHg on 100% oxygen are likely to have adequate arterial inflow but a local barrier to oxygen diffusion. Values for TcpO2 with 100% oxygen below 30 mmHg are consistent with severe artery disease.

==== Leg elevation ====
Leg elevations can be useful to assess the wound healing potential of patients with borderline TcpO2 values (20-40 mmHg). The patient’s leg is raised to a 30° angle (by placing a wedge-shaped support or using the bed). The study showed that leg elevation can reveal the macrocirculatory capacity to overcome the “uphill” challenge. Concluding that a TcpO2 value of up to 15mmHg below the baseline is normal, whereas greater drops are indicative of arterial deficiency.
