= Revascularization =

Medical treatment to restore perfusion to a body part that has had ischemia

- ICD-9-CM: 36.10, 36.2, 36.33, 36.34

In medical and surgical therapy, revascularization is the restoration of perfusion to a body part or organ that has had ischemia. It is typically accomplished by surgical means. Vascular bypass and angioplasty are the two primary means of revascularization.

Revascularization involves a thorough analysis and diagnosis and treatment of the existing diseased vasculature of the affected organ, and can be aided by the use of different imaging modalities such as magnetic resonance imaging, PET scan, CT scan, and X-ray fluoroscopy.

== Applications ==
For coronary artery disease (ischemic heart disease), coronary artery bypass surgery and percutaneous coronary intervention (coronary balloon angioplasty) are the two primary means of revascularization. When those cannot be done, transmyocardial revascularization or percutaneous myocardial revascularization, done with a laser, may be an option.

Treatment for gangrene often requires revascularization, if possible. The surgery is also indicated to treat ischemic wounds (inadequate tissue perfusion) in some forms of chronic wounds, such as diabetic ulcers.
