= Ulcer (dermatology) =

Type of cutaneous condition

Skin ulcer
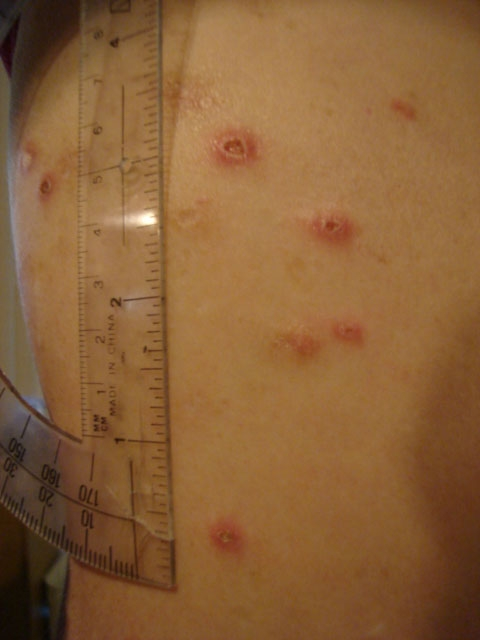
- Erythema nodosum – Skin ulcers that occur in some patients with inflammatory bowel disease
- Specialty: Dermatology, surgery

An ulcer is a sore on the skin or a mucous membrane, accompanied by the disintegration of tissue. Ulcers can result in complete loss of the epidermis and often portions of the dermis and even subcutaneous tissue. Ulcers are most common on the skin of the lower extremities and in the gastrointestinal tract. An ulcer that appears on the skin is often visible as an inflamed tissue with an area of reddened skin. A skin ulcer is often visible in the event of exposure to heat or cold, irritation, or a problem with blood circulation.

They can also be caused due to a lack of mobility, which causes prolonged pressure on the tissues. This stress in the blood circulation is transformed into a skin ulcer, commonly known as bedsores or decubitus ulcers. Ulcers often become infected, and pus forms.

== Signs and symptoms ==
Skin ulcers appear as open craters, often round, with layers of skin that have eroded. The skin around the ulcer may be red, swollen, and tender. Patients may feel pain in the skin around the ulcer, and fluid may ooze from the ulcer. In some cases, ulcers can bleed and, rarely, patients experience fever. Ulcers sometimes seem not to heal; healing, if it does occur, tends to be slow. Ulcers that heal within 12 weeks are usually classified as acute, and longer-lasting ones as chronic.

Ulcers develop in stages. In stage 1, the skin is red with soft underlying tissue. In the second stage, the redness of the skin becomes more pronounced, swelling appears, and there may be some blisters and loss of outer skin layers. During the next stage, the skin may become necrotic down through the deep layers of skin, and the fat beneath the skin may become exposed and visible. In stage 4, deeper necrosis usually occurs, the fat underneath the skin is completely exposed, and the muscle may also become exposed. In the last two stages, the sore may cause a deeper loss of fat and necrosis of the muscle; in severe cases, it can extend down to bone level, destruction of the bone may begin, and there may be sepsis of joints.

Chronic ulcers may be painful. Most patients complain of constant pain at night and during the day. Chronic ulcer symptoms usually include increasing pain, friable granulation tissue, foul odour, and wound breakdown instead of healing. Symptoms tend to worsen once the wound has become infected.

Venous skin ulcers that may appear on the lower leg, above the calf or on the lower ankle usually cause achy and swollen legs. If these ulcers become infected, they may develop an unpleasant odour, increased tenderness, and redness. Before the ulcer establishes definitively, there may be a dark red or purple skin over the affected area, as well as thickening, drying, and itchy skin.

Although skin ulcers do not seem of great concern at first glance, they are worrying conditions, especially in people with diabetes, as they are at risk of developing diabetic neuropathy.

Ulcers may also appear on the cheeks, soft palate, the tongue, and on the inside of the lower lip. These ulcers usually last from 7 to 14 days and can be painful.

=== Discharges ===
Different types of discharges from ulcer are:

- Serous, usually seen in healing ulcer
- Purulent, seen in an infected ulcer. Yellow creamy discharge is observed in staphylococcal infection; bloody opalescent discharge in streptococcal infection, while greenish discharge is seen in the case of Pseudomonas infection.
- Bloody (sanguineous), usually seen in malignant ulcers and in healing ulcers with healthy granulation tissue
- Seropurulent
- Serosanguinous
- Serous with sulphur granules, seen in actinomycosis
- Yellowish, as seen in tuberculous ulcer

== Causes ==
The wounds from which ulcers arise can be caused by a wide variety of factors, but the main cause is impaired blood circulation. Especially, chronic wounds and ulcers are caused by poor circulation, either through cardiovascular issues or external pressure from a bed or a wheelchair. A very common and dangerous type of skin ulcer is caused by what are called pressure-sensitive sores, more commonly called bed sores, which are frequent in people who are bedridden or who use wheelchairs for long periods.

Other causes producing skin ulcers include bacterial and viral infections, fungal infections and cancers. Blood disorders and chronic wounds can result in skin ulcers as well. Venous leg ulcers due to impaired circulation or a blood flow disorder are more common in the elderly.

Rare causes of skin ulcers include pyoderma gangraenosum, lesions caused by Crohn's disease or ulcerative colitis, granulomatosis with polyangiitis, morbus Behçet and infections that are usually seen in those who are immunocompromised, for example, ecthyma gangraenosum. It is important to consider such causes if the skin ulcerations don't show improvement with antibiotic treatments and when other systemic symptoms are present. It is advised not to use surgical procedures on ulcerations caused by Behçet or pyoderma gangraenosum since those diseases usually exhibit pathergy.

== Diagnosis ==
=== Grading ===
Wagner's grading of ulcer follows:

Grade	Description
0	Pre-ulcerative lesion or healed ulcer
1	Superficial ulcer
2	Ulcer deeper to subcutaneous tissue exposing soft tissue or bone
3	Abscess formation underneath, osteomyelitis
4	Gangrene of part of tissues, limb or foot
5	Gangrene of entire one area or foot

== Management ==
=== Investigations ===
Some of the investigations done for ulcer are:

- Study of discharging fluid: Culture and sensitivity
- Edge biopsy: Edge contains multiplying cells
- Radiograph of the affected area to look for periostitis or osteomyelitis
- Fine needle aspiration cytology (FNAC) of lymph node
- Chest X-ray and Mantoux test in suspected tuberculous ulcer

=== Treatment ===
Skin ulcers may take a very long time to heal. Treatment is typically to avoid the ulcer getting infected, remove any excess discharge, maintain a moist wound environment, control the edema, and ease pain caused by nerve and tissue damage.

Topical antibiotics are normally used to prevent the ulcer from getting infected, and the wound or ulcer is usually kept clear of dead tissue through surgical debridement.

Commonly, as a part of the treatment, patients are advised to change their lifestyle if possible and to change their diet. Improving the circulation is important in treating skin ulcers, and patients are consequently usually recommended to exercise, stop smoking, and lose weight.

In recent years, advances have been made in accelerating the healing of chronic wounds and ulcers. Chronic wounds produce fewer growth hormones than necessary for healing tissue, and healing may be accelerated by replacing or stimulating growth factors while controlling the formation of other substances that work against them.

Leg ulcers can be prevented by using compression stockings to prevent blood pooling and backflow. It is likely that a person who has had a skin ulcer will have it again; use of compression stockings every day for at least five years after the skin ulcer has healed may help to prevent recurrence.

There is limited evidence that negative-pressure wound therapy may be effective in reducing the time to healing of leg ulcers.

== Specific types ==
- Arterial insufficiency ulcer: mostly located on the lateral surface of the ankle or the distal digits
- Cortisol ulcer: caused by long term application of cortisol (steroid) topical creams to certain skin diseases.
- Diabetic foot ulcer: a major complication of diabetes mellitus, and probably the major component of the diabetic foot.
- Venous ulcer: thought to occur due to improper functioning of venous valves, usually of the legs

== See also ==
- List of cutaneous conditions
- Skin disease
- Skin lesion
