= Wound bed preparation =

Medical treatment approach

Wound bed preparation (WBP) is a systematic approach to wound management by identifying and removing barriers to healing. The concept was originally developed in plastic surgery. It includes wound assessment, debridement, moisture balance, bacterial balance, and wound cleaning.

== Conceptual frameworks ==
=== As applied to chronic wounds ===
During the year 2000, the concept was applied to systematizing the treatment of chronic wounds. The 2000 proposals recommended that wound management address the identifiable impediments to healing in order to achieve more successful outcomes. Three publications appeared that year that focused on the concept of managing the healing processes of a wound exudate, bioburden and devitalized tissue. Initially, emphasis was placed on debridement, moisture balance and bacterial balance as the three guiding principles of good wound care, while at the same time recognizing that the provision of care includes a vast array of patient, clinical and environmental variables.

=== TIME acronym (Tissue, Inflammation and Infection, Moisture, Epithelial) ===
Since the year 2000, the wound bed preparation concept has continued to improve. For example, the TIME acronym (Tissue management, Inflammation and infection control, Moisture balance, Epithelial (edge) advancement) has supported the transition of basic science to the bedside in order to exploit appropriate wound healing interventions and has not deviated from the important tenets of debridement, moisture balance, and bacterial balance.

The TIME framework is not a continuum and as such is applicable to a wide range of wounds. The WBP model can be effectively applied only when a high level of precision is utilized in the assessment of the patient and their wound. The corollary of this is that intervention demands an equally high level of precision and this should be preceded by a comprehensive wound assessment.

== Aspects of wounds and wound care ==
=== Wound assessment ===
Wound assessment is a vital first step in the precision management process.

The purpose of wound assessment is:

To identify:

- the origin of the wound,
- the effects of the wound on the individual,
- the effects of the individual on the wound.

To determine:

- if healing is taking place,
- the most appropriate management of the wound.

To gather data:

- to permit a comparison of wounds and their management.

Unfortunately, universal agreement as regards the precise mechanisms of how this should be accomplished is yet to be agreed.

=== Debridement ===
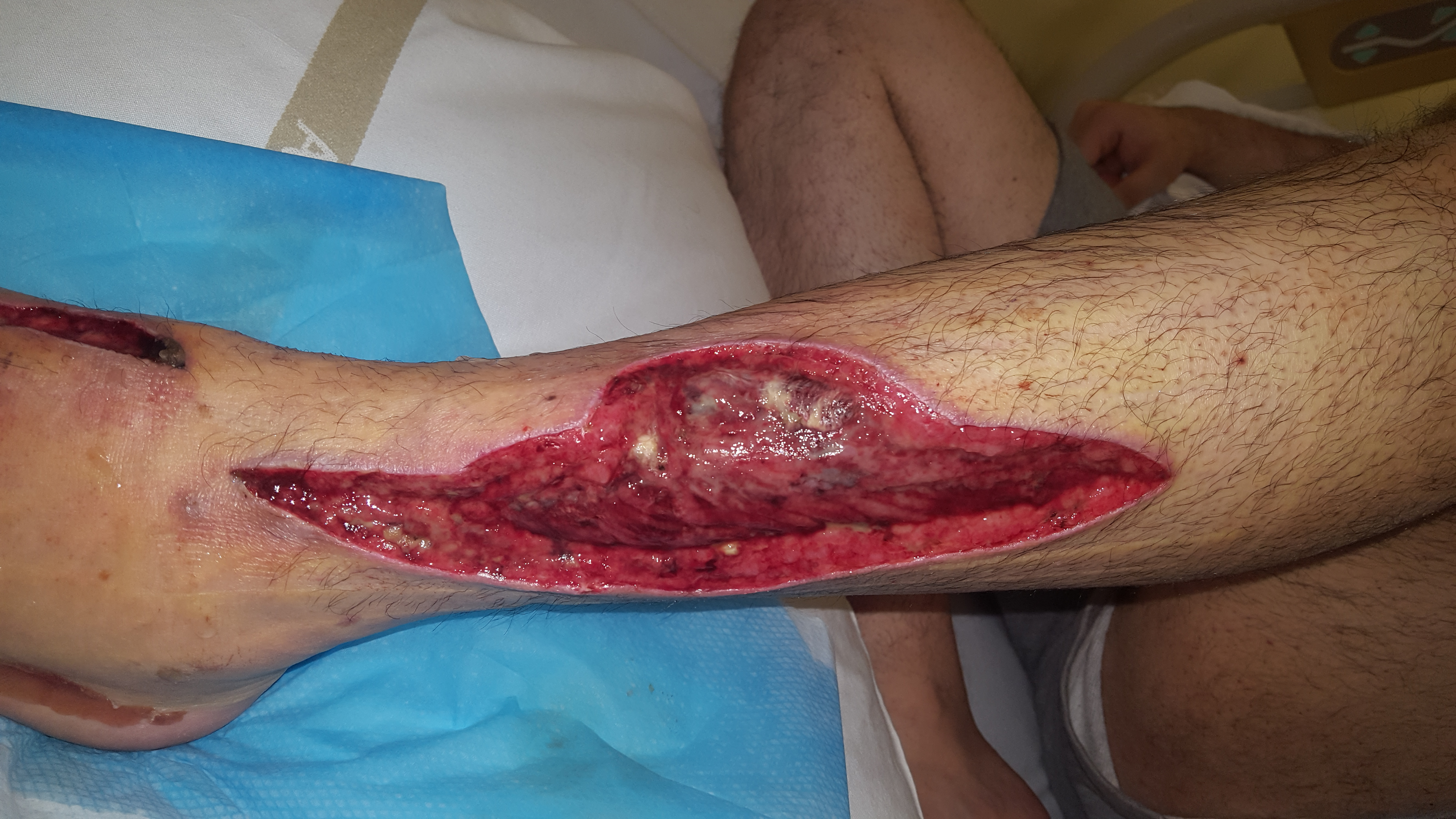
An open wound after debridement

Debridement is an essential element of effective wound care. Although this view is deeply rooted in practice it is nonetheless based on empirical observation. Bradley et al. have stated that it is "unclear whether wound debridement is a beneficial process that expedites healing". Despite this confusing situation, current recommendation favours regular debridement. It is thought that even in an immune compromised patient debridement can assist in establishing a favourable balance of the wound bioburden.

=== Moisture balance ===
Establishing a moisture balance beneficial to the wound bed is another prerequisite of care. The natural response to injury is inflammation typified by the local expression of histamine and bradykinin and leading to vasodilation of the vessels that are in relative close proximity to the site of injury. As serum based fluid moves out of the vessels into the interstitial spaces the resultant soft tissue oedema manifests on the wound surface as exudate. In the chronic wound this exudate contains a surfeit of proteolytic enzymes and other components not seen in acute wounds and these compounds have a corrosive effect on the wound bed and surrounding peri-wound skin. The application of dressings, topical negative pressure, compression garments and leg elevation/exercise have been identified as methods for management of wound exudate.

=== Bacterial balance ===
All wounds are considered to harbor microorganisms. Management of the bacterial balance is of vital importance if delays in healing are to be avoided. The biological removal of micro-organisms, including potential pathogens, and tissue debris from the wound of an immune-competent patient is a wound cleansing activity that takes place almost immediately after wounding and which helps to reduce the threat of infection. However, a range of risk factors exist that increase the likelihood of infection intervening, and these include; age, depleted nutrition, down-regulation of the immune system, systemic disease, and poor tissue perfusion of oxygen. Thus, in the above circumstances or when a wound has become infected, wound cleansing activities beyond the natural biological processes are required so that the wound bioburden is maintained at a level where the host can remain in control.

=== Biofilms ===
==== Biofilm infection ====
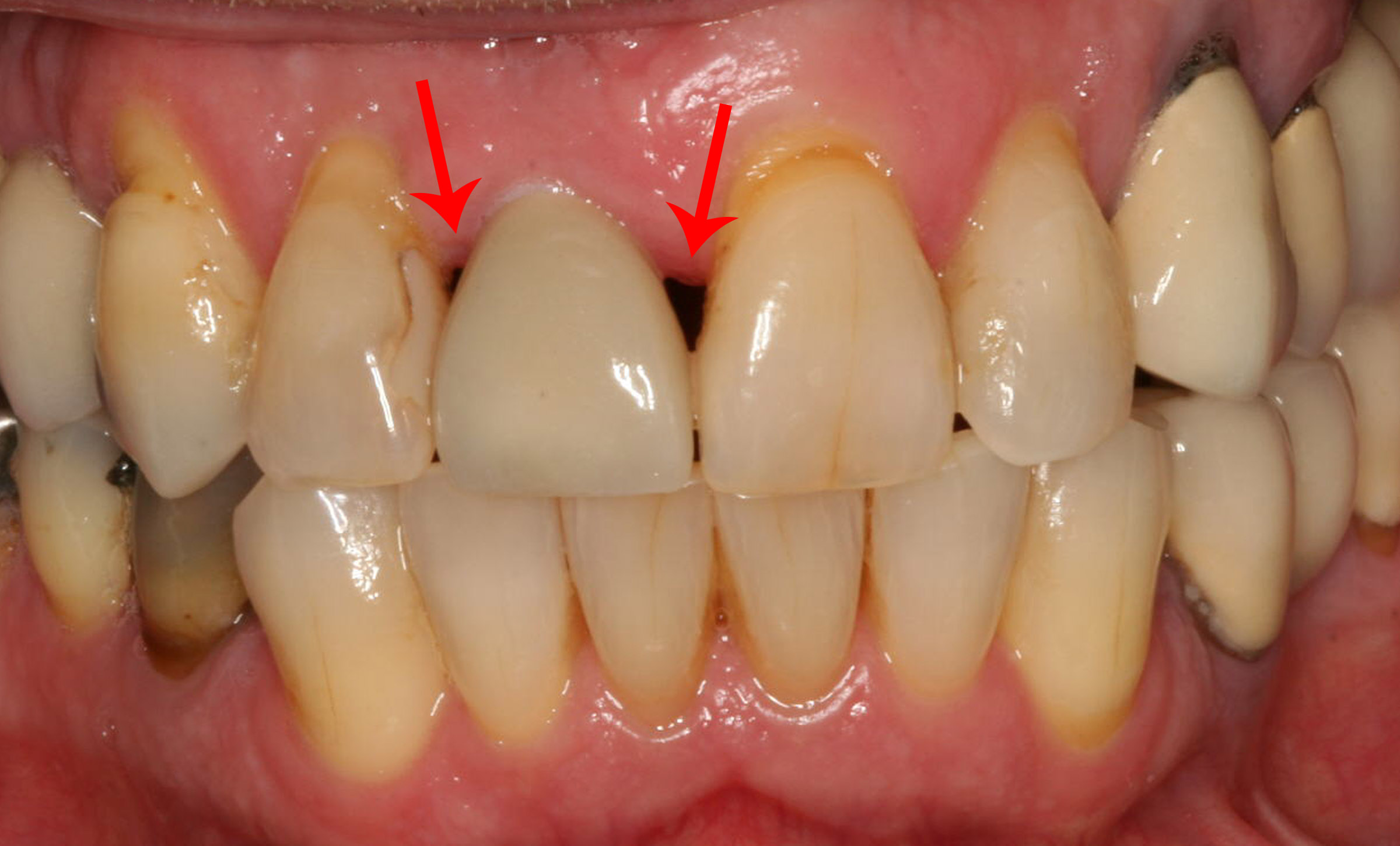
The mouth in a case of dental calculus, which is often caused by biofilms

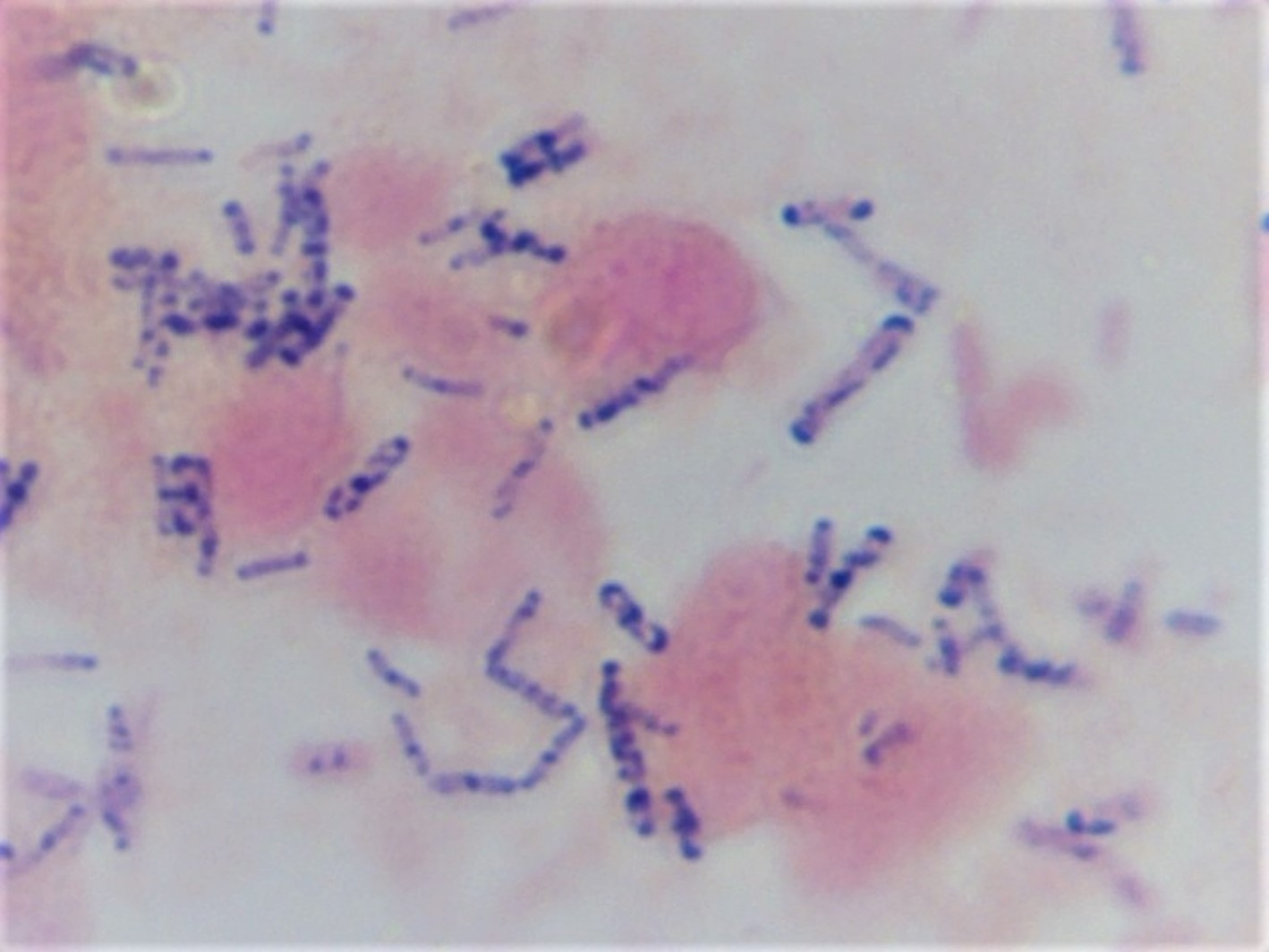
Cells in a Gram stain of pus

Attaching to a surface is a natural association for bacteria in the wild. Biofilm phenotype bacteria are microbial communities that are attached to a surface and are embedded in an extracellular polymeric substance (EPS) consisting of proteins, glycoproteins, nucleic acids (RNA, DNA) and polysaccharides (slime). This mantle affords protection from antimicrobial and cellular attack. In contrast, planktonic phenotype bacteria are free-floating in nature and do not possess the defence structures afforded by the creation of the EPS slime. Within the biofilm, a rich biological diversity may be found. The attached (sessile) bacteria release proteases which help to perpetuate a chronic inflammatory state. Therefore, the potential exists for these exogenous proteases to work in tandem with endogenously produced proteases and degrade growth factors and tissue proteins that are necessary for the healing process.

==== Biofilm management ====
We are developing greater insight into the association between delayed healing and the presence of biofilm. The relationship between delayed healing and the need for debridement is also being acknowledged. It has been suggested that the presence of wound slough provides an indication of biofilm presence, therefore, indicating the need to reduce the wound bioburden.

Methods of effectively managing wound biofilms have been reported and include the use of topical agents, systemic antibiotics and regular episodes of debridement.

Despite these advances it has been recognised that indiscriminate and widespread use of antibiotics both inside and outside of medicine is playing a substantial role in the emergence of bacterial resistance.

On a more positive note, antiseptics have been reported to possess a clear cut role in the control of wound bioburden where there are indications or risk of infection.

== Wound cleansing and excision ==
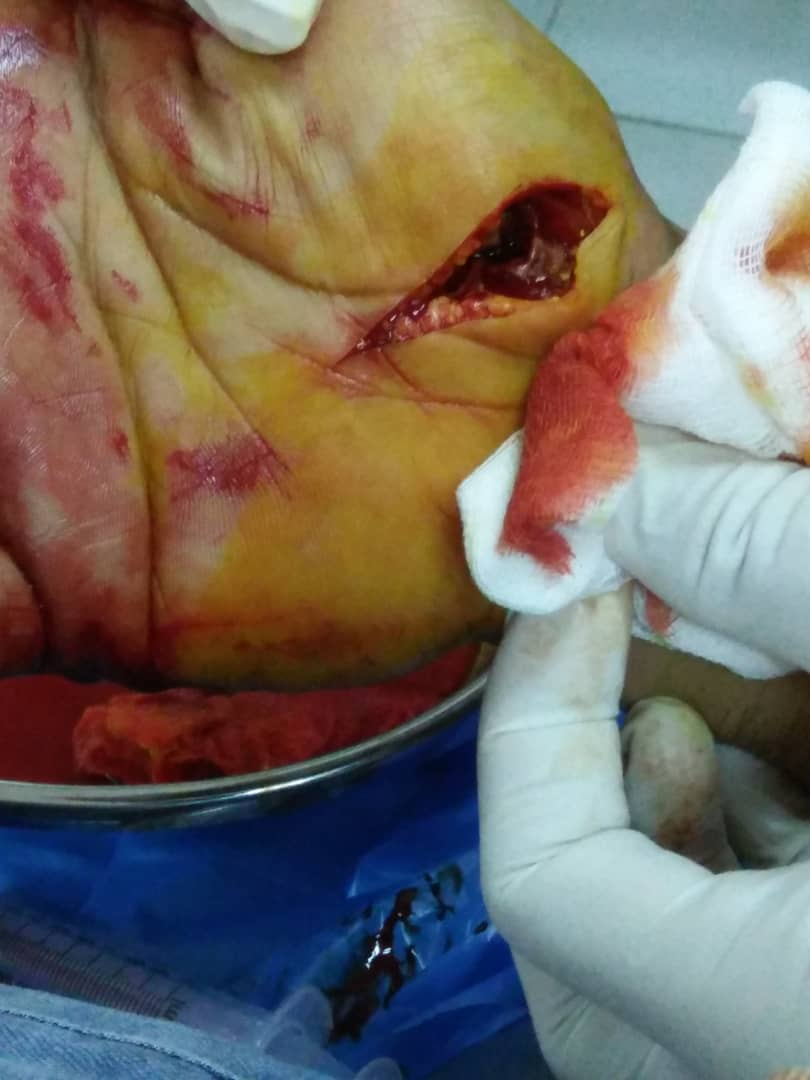
Iodine used to disinfect a deep wound on a person's palm

Wound cleansing is a fundamental component of wound care. It consists of the removal of foreign matter, dead (devitalized) tissue and other physical impedimenta to healing, such as ragged edges. Despite the move in the 21st century toward evidence-based practice, the only general consensus that exists here is that cleansing and excision reduce infection rates. The recommendation has been made that cleansing is required when:

- excess exudate is delaying healing,
- infected exudate is present,
- there is contamination by a foreign body including dirt and bacteria
- devitalised tissue (slough and necrosis) is present.

Wound cleansing is often undertaken as a ritual exercise rather than as an evidence-based activity. However, it has a role to play in all four domains of the WBP model. Wounds that are 'clean' and progressing do not require extraneous cleansing.

=== Criteria for a cleansing agent ===
Wound cleansing forms an integral part of wound management and generally suggests the application of a fluid to aid the removal of surface contaminants, bacteria, and debris from the wound surface and surrounding skin. Water as a cleansing agent, especially in chronic wounds has been proposed and is widely used especially in the management of infected wounds. Despite the plethora of work focussing on the value of water/saline in wound cleansing there is no current consensus as to whether water has an active role to play in the promotion of healing.

With this unclear position in mind, alternative cleansing agents such as antiseptics that possess the potential to improve clinical outcomes should be considered.

The use of antiseptics on open wounds is justified in terms of prevention/treatment of infection and improved healing outcomes.

Criteria by which a wound cleansing agent could be deemed suitable for use on wounds include:

- non-toxic to mammalian cells
- broad spectrum in action
- reduction of wound bioburden
- maintaining optimal moist wound environment
- easy to apply
- manages wound pain and malodor
- does not cause pain on application
- compatible with a variety of available wound dressings

There is a scant evidential provision in respect of guidance as to the optimal wound cleanser. In general, recommendations for practice are based on consensus opinion often derived from clinical experience and in vitro and/or in vivo studies.

=== Specific agents ===
==== Polyhexamethylene biguanide (polyhexanide, PHMB) ====
Chemical structure of polyhexanide

Polyhexamethylene biguanide hydrochloride is a fast-acting, broad-spectrum synthetic compound that binds to the cell envelope of both Gram-positive and Gram-negative bacteria, disrupting the bacterial cell membrane and enabling seepage of ions. PHMB has a long history of use as a contact lens cleanser, mouthwash and more recently in wound care.

It is regarded as being quite safe to use as it has been incorporated as a preservative in cosmetics. A retrospective analysis of wound cleanser clinical efficacy and cost-effectiveness focused on polyhexamethylene biguanide solution, Ringer's solution or saline in 112 venous leg ulcer patients. The study group received the polyhexamethylene biguanide solution (n=59) and the control group received either Ringer's solution or saline (n=53). In both arms, ulcer healing patterns were evaluated. Within the first 3 months of treatment, a shorter time to healing was recorded in the study group when compared with the control group - 60% v. 28% with corresponding mean time to healing being 3.31 months (study group) compared to 4.42 months (control group) p= <0.0001. More patients in the polyhexamethylene biguanide group healed in the 6-month period when compared with the controls - 97% v. 89%. The authors concluded that optimization of the local wound environment was significantly influenced through cleansing with polyhexanide solution.

In an in vitro model developed to compare the efficiency of wound-rinsing solutions, Kaehn et al. compared four sterile wound-cleansing solutions (saline, Ringer's solution, Prontosan® and Octenisept®) using a wound coating model consisting of slides containing dried blood plasma or fibrin. The concentration of dissolved proteins was measured and the findings indicate that a surfactant containing solution (polyhexamethylene biguanide with betaine) (Prontosan®) was more effective than saline in removing the protein (adhered dried plasma or fibrin). The proteins in the antiseptic solution (Octenisept®) were denatured and became insoluble. The authors suggest this implies that the antiseptic solution is unsuitable as a 'general' wound cleanser and that its use should be restricted to infected wounds.

In a double-blind, randomised, stratified, controlled, parallel-group study the influence of two antiseptics (octenidine, polyhexanide) versus a placebo of Ringer's solution on wound healing in a porcine model was conducted. Assessment of healing was recorded using planimetry and histopathology. At nine days post wounding, the octenidine-treated wounds demonstrated retarded contraction at significantly greater extent than placebo and polyhexanide. At days 18 and 28 the polyhexanide treated wounds supported contraction significantly more than placebo and octenidine. The polyhexanide treated wounds led to complete wound closure after 22.9 days, in comparison to the placebo octenidine treated wounds respectively, 24.1 days (p < 0.05) and 28.3 days (no statistical difference to placebo).

==== Prontosan ====
Prontosan (B Braun) Wound Irrigation Solution and Prontosan Wound Gel are proprietary preparations of PHMB with betaine, an alkaloid surfactant. Surfactants lower the surface tension of the fluid medium making it easier to infiltrate wound coatings, debris and bacteria. Both the wound irrigation solution and the wound gel are colorless cleansing agents that are indicated for use in acute and chronic wounds. They also have the potential to be used in conjunction with a range of dressing materials which include occlusive dressings.

In vitro studies on clinical isolates of E. coli and S. epidermidis have demonstrated the anti-biofilm efficacy of PHMB. The activity of five biocides at various concentrations was recorded following exposure to the isolates. The biocides found to be most active towards planktonic (free floating) cells were PHMB and peracetic acid. A corresponding level of activity towards biofilm phenotype bacteria was also found with the two agents.

Prontosan's activity on MRSA biofilms has been investigated using an in vivo porcine wound model. Prontosan activity was compared with Ringer's solution, saline, and untreated control. A comparative reduction in MRSA at 48 and 72 hours in the Prontosan-treated group was found to be statistically significant compared to the other groups (p-value <0.05). The study results indicated that extended irrigation with Prontosan may provide additional reduction in wound bioburden as the largest reduction of MRSA was found from 48 to 72 hours.

A clinical evaluation of Prontosan wound cleanser was undertaken with ten community care patients where saline had been used for at least one month previously on wounds that had a mean duration of 2.6 years. The findings include; an overall reduction in wound size, a reduction in malodour, reduction or elimination of wound pain. These results correlate well with the patients' reports of improvement in quality of life and a reduction in the number of nursing visits. In addition, the wound cleansing effects of Prontosan with achieving a visible wound bed was reported by the author and linked to the removal of wound biofilm. Although this association is speculative it does appear to correspond with the other reported improvements found in these wounds.

== Conclusions ==
Wound bed preparation is an accepted strategy that facilitates wound management interventions. Management of wound exudate, bioburden and debridement are all associated with effective wound cleansing and are thus integral components of effectual wound bed preparation. Choice of cleansing solution should consider not only the piecemeal wound requirements but also the patient and be reinforced by a sound knowledge/experience base. This knowledge should include insight into bacterial phenotype 'behavior' and the most appropriate methods of management. Current findings indicate that PHMB in conjunction with a surfactant (betaine) is superior to Ringer's solution and saline when used as wound cleansers and also appears to demonstrate efficacy when used in wounds where biofilms are suspected or present.
