= Micropore particle technology =

Micropore particle technology consists of fine, highly porous particles that remove fluid by a combination of capillary action and evaporation. Currently, they are mainly used in wound healing, where they absorb wound exudate into their micropore structure. Here capillary flow transports the exudate away from the wound surface towards the upper surface of the MPPT layer, where a highly expanded surface area facilitates effective evaporation. The MPPT essentially acts as small micro-pumps, which, due to their small size, are able to access all crevices in the wound surface.

The micro-pumping action of the particles appears to disrupt the weaponry used by bacteria and fungi against the immune system. First, the toxins and enzymes released by bacteria and fungi against the immune cells are removed, whereby the immune cells regain their function. Second, the micropumping action creates holes in the surface of biofilm. Biofilm acts as a shield that bacteria and fungi secrete to protect themselves against the immune cells. By creating holes in this shield, the immune cells become able to enter the biofilm layer and selectively remove bacteria and fungi that they do not want to be present. The result is that the immune system is able to remove an infection in a wound or on the skin. MPPT, therefore, functions as passive immunotherapy. It has no antibacterial effects, but it can remove antibiotic-resistant infections and it will not contribute to the creation of new antimicrobial resistance.

== Effects of MPPT on wound healing ==
MPPT has been evaluated in a preclincial wound healing model and in a 266 patient comparative clinical study, which included a wide range of wound types. The study found that MPPT reduced the time to achieving an infection-free and healing wound by 60% compared to a topical antibiotic (genamicin) and to the antiseptic iodine. MPPT also reduced the number of hospitalisation days by 31% compared to the antibiotic.

At Bristol University Hospital, MPPT was evaluated for use on wounds. The study included nine dehisced surgical wounds and one category 4 pressure ulcer. Standard-of-care for these types of wounds are one week with UrgoClean followed by 2 or more weeks with Negative Pressure Wound Therapy (NPWT). Wounds receiving MPPT were able to achieve the same stage of wound healing in 4–5 days as would have required 3 or more weeks with standard-of-care, thus offering savings of 67%. All wounds receiving MPPT closed.

MPPT has also been used on diabetic foot ulcers and venous leg ulcers, including ulcers that were chronic and non-healing and in all cases it has been able to promote healing. MPPT has also been used on pressure ulcers, including chronic non-healing ulcers and was in a similar manner able to promote healing.

A poster was recently presented by the Birmingham University Hospitals at the British Association of Dermatologists, which showed that MPPT was able to assist the healing of 3 chronic, stable pyoderma gangrenosum ulcers. In one patient, it was possible to reduce the dose of immunosuppressant. These findings extend the use of MPPT into dermatology and positive effects have been observed in hidradenitis suppurativa.

The MPPT technology has been approved in the EU as a "treatment for wounds" and is currently the only wound product with this approval. Other medical devices for wounds are approved to have a certain effect on the wound, e.g. add moisture or remove wound exudate, but they are not recognised as treatments.
