= IVT =

IVT may refer to:

== In computing ==
- Interrupt vector table, a memory construct in some processors
- Intel Virtualization Technology, a computer processor feature to simplify virtualization

== Other ==
- Intermediate value theorem, a theorem in mathematical analysis
- Initial value theorem, a mathematical theorem using Laplace transform
- Integrated water vapor transport, a meteorological term used in describing atmospheric rivers
- Current, Voltage, Temperature
- Infinitely Variable Transmission, a type of continuously variable transmission system for motor vehicles and other applications
- Illini Variable Temperature diluent
- In Vitro transcription/translation, a molecular biology technique to produce RNA in a tube
- Intermittent vacuum therapy, a medical treatment for venous and arterial issues
