= Ankle flare =

Reddening of the skin around an injury

- Diagnostic method: deep vein thrombosis

A "flare" is a spreading area of redness or flush. It is the second reaction in the triple response to injury and is due to the dilatation of the arterioles. When this flare occurs around the ankle, it is called an ankle flare. The condition is also known as a malleolar flare, in reference to the malleolus, the bony prominence on each side of the ankle.

Ankle flares are often caused by venous ulcers, due to deep vein thrombosis or varicose veins. It is considered to be an early sign of advanced venous disease. Treatment involves management of the underlying condition, along with supportive care.

== See also ==
- Corona phlebectatica
