= Kinetic Concepts =

Biotechnology company

- Company type: Subsidiary of 3M
- Industry: Medical devices, medical technology
- Founded: San Antonio, Texas, 1976
- Headquarters: San Antonio, Texas, United States
- Products: Items related to negative pressure wound therapy and wound healing
- Revenue: $1.6 billion ▲ (2010)
- Net income: $256.1 million ▲ (2010)
- Number of employees: 5,000 (2013)
- Website: kci1.com at the Wayback Machine (archived 2009-09-21)

Kinetic Concepts, Inc., (KCI) was a global corporation that produced medical technology related to wounds and wound healing. KCI produced the first product developed specifically for negative pressure wound therapy. In 2013, the company employed 5,000 people and marketed its products in more than 25 countries. Its headquarters were in San Antonio, Texas.

KCI, LifeCell and Systagenix operated under the Acelity brand.

In October 2019, Acelity and its KCI subsidiaries worldwide were acquired by 3M for $6.7 billion, including assumption of debt and other adjustments.

== Operations ==
KCI is composed of three business units: Active Healing Solutions, LifeCell and Therapeutic Support Systems, that operate in the wound care, regenerative medicine and therapeutic support systems markets. The largest of these business units is dedicated to wound care primarily negative pressure wound therapy for the treatment of traumatic wounds, pressure ulcers, chronic wounds and diabetic ulcers but also assistance with surgery. The therapeutic support systems developed and supplied by KCI are largely for the treatment and prevention of complications associated with patient immobility. These include support surfaces for hospital beds and home patients designed to address pulmonary complications in immobile patients. KCI also develops specialty beds for use in hospitals or in long-term care facilities. KCI expanded into the regenerative medicine market in 2008. Through subsidiary company LifeCell Corporation, KCI develops and supplies tissue-based products. These include tissue-based treatments used in surgical procedures to repair soft-tissue.

== Corporate history ==
KCI was founded in 1976 in San Antonio, Texas, by James R. Leininger, then an emergency room physician who wanted to help prevent the pulmonary complications associated with immobility. Over time, the company developed or acquired a line of therapeutic specialty beds, introducing a specialty bed for acute care patients with pulmonary complications. Initially KCI's product development focused on therapeutic beds and surfaces then expanded to introduce the first commercial negative pressure wound therapy products in the mid-1990s. KCI acquired regenerative medicine company, LifeCell, in 2008 in a non-hostile transaction for US$1.7 billion. In January 2012, LifeCell was made a sister company to KCI. In 2013, LifeCell and KCI recombined into one company.

== Financial information ==
From the founding of the company in 1976 to 1988, the revenue of KCI grew to US$153.2 million. The growth in revenue allowed KCI to go public and trade on the New York Stock Exchange (NYSE) in 1988. KCI stock was traded on the NYSE until 1997, when the company went private. In February 2004, KCI became a publicly listed company for the second time and was listed on the NYSE under the ticker symbol KCI.

By the late 2000s, the company's revenue was over $1 billion and reported an increase of 17 percent in 2007 to $1.61 billion. Revenue for 2008 was $1.88 billion, increasing to $1.99 billion in 2009 and in 2010 increased to $2.02 billion. On November 4, 2011, the company went private again at a price of $68.50 per share.

== Product lines ==
- V.A.C. systems used for negative pressure wound therapy.

== See also ==
- Negative pressure wound therapy
- Pressure ulcer
