= Non-contact normothermic wound therapy =

Non-contact normothermic (or nonthermal) wound therapy, also called The Warm-Up Therapy System or wound therapy with infrared radiation, is the process of increasing the temperature of the wound bed, thereby promoting increased blood flow in the area around the wound. It is a temporary therapy (usually about 72 hours for each time usage) in which the dressing contains a special electronic warming card. The card heats to 100.4 °F (38 °C), bathing the wound in radiant heat. The closely sealed wound covering promotes a moist environment in the wound bed.

It is sometimes indicated in wounds that have failed to heal with conventional therapies including wounds with compromised blood flow, diabetic ulcers, and bed sores.
