= Apex Medical =

Wellell
- Type: Public
- Traded as: TWSE: 4106
- Industry: Medical device manufacture & service provider
- Founded: 1990
- Founder: Daniel Lee
- Headquarters: New Taipei, Taiwan
- Products: Therapeutic support surface; Respiratory Therapy; Sterilization equipment; Intermittent Pneumatic Compression; Patient Lift System; Mobility; Personal Care; Durable Medical Equipment
- Number of employees: 1000+

Wellell, formerly known as Apex Medical, is a multinational corporation specializing in medical treatments including therapeutic support surface, respiratory therapy (CPAP & respiratory mask, nebulizer, suction machine), sterilization equipment, and intermittent pneumatic compression devices. The products are typically used in commercial and government healthcare facilities, like hospitals and rehabilitation facilities.

== History ==
Wellell was established in 1990 in Taiwan. Between 2000 and 2006, Wellell expanded internationally into China, the United States, Spain, and Southeast Asia.

Between 2011 and 2020, Wellell acquired and merged several existing brands and expanded their products, including:

- Sturdy Industrial Co. Ltd which optimized Wellell's sterilization market prospects.
- Westmeria Healthcare Ltd.
- SLK Vertriebs GmbH and SLK Medical GmbH
- Nexus DMS Ltd

In 2022, Apex Medical announced a rebrand to Wellell, a fusion between the words "wellbeing" and "wellspring".
