= Chronic wound pain =

- Specialty: Surgery

Chronic wound pain is a condition described as unremitting, disabling, and recalcitrant pain experienced by individuals with various types of chronic wounds. Chronic wounds such as venous leg ulcers, arterial ulcers, diabetic foot ulcers, pressure ulcers, and malignant wounds can have an enormous impact on an individual’s quality of life with pain being one of the most distressing symptoms.

The pain experienced by individuals with chronic wounds can be acute or chronic. Acute wound pain is intermittent and exacerbated by manipulation of the wound during procedures such as dressing changes or debridement. Chronic wound pain has been present for six months or more and occurs without any manipulation of the wound. Chronic wound pain is persistent and exists at rest.

Persistent pain is used interchangeably or to replace the term chronic pain. Intermittent or continuous pain that is present for three months or more is considered as persistent pain. Persistent pain is also referred to as neuropathic pain.

Depending on the sensation associated with neuropathic pain, it may be considered as acute or chronic. Acute neuropathic pain is associated with burning, squeezing, throbbing, shooting, or electric shock sensations that resolve. Neuropathic sensations such as numbness, tingling, and prickling are considered as chronic neuropathic pain. Chronic neuropathic pain may be intermittent or continuous, and may remain unresolved post-tissue healing.

== Classifications ==
Nociceptive pain is a physiological response described as stabbing, throbbing, aching, or sharp. Nociceptive pain is considered to be an appropriate to painful stimuli that occurs as a result of underlying tissue damage and may be acute or chronic. Persistent nociceptive pain may be due to conditions causing ongoing tissue damage such as ischemia, or edema. Neuropathic pain is associated with chronic pain and results from a nervous system dysfunction, which causes an inappropriate response to pain. Neuropathic pain is described as burning or tingling persistent pain.

Three types of nociceptive pain are experienced with chronic wounds; cyclic acute wound pain, non cyclic acute wound pain, and chronic wound pain. Cyclic acute wound pain may be experienced in conjunction with chronic wound pain and occurs during regular routines such as dressing changes or repositioning. Noncyclic acute wound pain is intermittent and usually occurs during procedures such as sharp debridement. Chronic wound pain is described as acute or chronic. Acute pain is nociceptive pain that serves as a warning to prevent mechanical, chemical, and thermal injuries. Acute pain is relieved when the damaging source is reduced. Chronic pain has physical and emotional components and is rarely an indication of ongoing damage.

In order to effectively manage wound pain, the type of wound pain must be determined to facilitate pain relief. Neuropathic pain may require different interventions and medications than the traditional analgesics, which are effective in the treatment of nociceptive pain.

== Assessment and cause ==
Verbalization of pain is considered the most valid indicator of pain because pain is subjective and whatever the individual complaining of pain says it is. Standardized tools that have been validated in the assessment of pain are commonly used to assess wound pain are; Visual Analogue Scale (VAS), Numeric Box Scale (NBS), Faces Pain Rating Scale (FRS), and The Short McGill Pain Questionnaire, which may be difficult to use with patients who are unable to verbalize and describe their pain. The Wound Pain Management Model (WPMM) was developed to outline the important components of wound pain assessment. The WPMM indicates wound pain assessment should include: location, intensity, duration, and the impact on quality of life. Chronic wound pain has been underrecognized and often goes untreated, or undertreated. Contributing factors for poor wound pain management are a lack of, or inadequate wound pain assessment. Negative consequences of chronic wound pain may be impaired quality of life due to sleep deprivation or disturbances, immobility, depression, changes in body image, constipation due to side effects of pain medications, infection, and stress. Chronic wound pain can cause sleep disturbances or deprivation, depression, immobility, and changes in body image, infection, stress, and constipation due to side effects of pain medications can have a negative impact on the quality of life. Chronic wound pain may vary depending on the cause of the wound. Venous leg ulcers, arterial ulcers, diabetic foot ulcers, pressure ulcers, malignancy, infection, inflammation and stress are associated with chronic wound pain.

== Venous leg ulcers ==
Venous leg ulcers are commonly associated with chronic wound pain. The pain prevalence rate for venous leg ulcers is 50-87%. The pain experienced with venous leg ulcers may be constant, or intermittent varying in intensity. Venous leg ulcers may cause nociceptive and neuropathic pain, and ultimately be expressed as persistent background pain. Venous leg ulceration is due to poor venous return and venous hypertension as resulting from venous reflux or obstruction.1 Consequences of venous leg ulcers are infection, cellulitis, and infection. Venous leg ulcers can affect mobility and ultimately quality of life.

== Arterial ulcers ==
Arterial ulcers can cause nociceptive pain as a result of peripheral ischemia. Atherosclerosis causes arterial insufficiency and occlusion, which contribute to the development of arterial ulcers. The pain with arterial ulcers may be increased when the affected extremity is elevated, and decreased when the affected extremity is in a dependent position.

== Diabetic foot ulcers ==
Diabetic foot ulcers affect 15% of people living with diabetes mellitus and cause 50% of non-traumatic amputations of the lower extremities. The pain experienced by individuals with diabetic foot ulcers can be described as burning, tingling, and shooting sensations due to diabetic or peripheral neuropathy. More than half of the individuals who undergo an amputation as a result of a diabetic foot ulcer undergo a second amputation within five years.

== Pressure ulcers ==
Pressure ulcers are caused by unrelieved pressure or friction and shear in combination with pressure. The pain experienced with pressure ulcers can be excruciating and may occur at rest and with dressing changes. The pain associated with pressure ulcers may be due to ischemia, friction, shear, infection, neuropathy, poor nutrition, muscle spasm, moisture, incontinence, immobility, and deep tissue injury.

== Malignant wounds ==
Malignant or fungating wounds are caused by proliferation and infiltration of malignant cells into the skin and the surrounding lymphatic vessels. Malignant wounds can be painful and cause isolation due to the effect on self-esteem due to changes in body image as a result of malignant wounds.

== Infection ==
Infection results when the wound’s micro-organisms overcome the immune system’s natural defense to fight off replicating micro-organisms. Chronic wounds that persist for more than 12 weeks should be evaluated for delayed healing, increase exudate, foul odor, additional areas of skin breakdown or slough on the wound bed, and bright red discoloration of granulation tissue, which may be indicative of infection.
