= No reflow phenomenon =

- Specialty: Vascular surgery, Interventional cardiology
- Causes: Microvascular obstruction
- Risk factors: Diabetes, chronic inflammatory states, old age, myocardial infarction
- Treatment: Nitroprusside
- Prognosis: Poor

No reflow phenomenon is the failure of blood to reperfuse an ischemic area after the physical obstruction has been removed or bypassed. The underlying mechanism is related to arterial microvasculature damage. It is primarily seen during percutaneous coronary intervention (PCI) in the setting of acute myocardial infarction (AMI), but has also been observed in other organs, including the brain and kidneys. Coronary no-reflow phenomenon is specifically related to reduced antegrade coronary blood flow despite proximal coronary artery patency. It is an independent predictor of worse clinical outcomes including heart failure, fatal arrhythmias, myocardial infarction, and increased mortality rates.

== Pathophysiology ==
The underlying mechanism of no reflow phenomenon is centered around the damage caused by microvascular obstruction (MVO). There have been two proposed underlying causes of no reflow phenomenon:

1. Structural no reflow phenomenon is present in the microvasculature of regions of necrotic myocardium. Prolonged ischemia impairs perfusion to the endothelial cells that line the walls of the microvasculature. Impaired perfusion leads to decreased ATP production within the endothelial cells, which ultimately leads to cellular swelling and irreversible damage of the endothelial cells. This cell damage contributes to the formation of fibrin thrombi within the microvasculature, occluding the vasculature lumen, and resulting in MVO. Additionally, swelling within necrotic tissue surrounding the microvasculature can further compress the vessel lumen, resulting in loss of capillary integrity, and further contributing to MVO. Structural no reflow is largely irreversible. An example would be seen in an area of myocardium post-myocardial infarction that was not reperfused quickly enough.
2. Functional no reflow phenomenon occurs when the microvasculature is anatomically intact, but has been temporarily compromised due to spasm, microembolization, or reperfusion injury, ultimately leading to MVO. Functional no reflow phenomenon is largely reversible due to the fact that the microvasculature is still intact.
  1. Micromembolization can occur during primary percutaneous coronary intervention (pPCI) to revascularize an occluded epicardial vessel due to disruption of thromboembolic material, such as plaques within the coronary arteries.
  2. Reperfusion following ischemia causes acute inflammation within the microvasculature, leading to neutrophilic proliferation. Neutrophils further contribute to endothelial cell damage by releasing free radicals via oxygen-dependent mechanisms, as well as pro-inflammatory mediators. Pro-inflammatory mediators contribute to MVO by causing extravasation of red blood cells, platelets, and leukocytes, into the vessel lumen.
  3. Neutrophils and platelets within the microvasculature cause alpha-adrenergic activation of the neurohumoral system. This leads to prolonged vasospasm of the microvasculature, further contributing to MVO.

In both types of no reflow phenomenon, the extent of damage to the microvasculature is directly proportional to the length of time the tissue is ischemic, with longer periods of ischemia related to greater damage to the arterial microvasculature.

== See also ==
- Venous ulcer
