= Periwound =

Tissue surrounding a wound

The periwound (also peri-wound) is tissue surrounding a wound. Periwound area is traditionally limited to 4 cm outside the wound's edge but can extend beyond this limit if outward damage to the skin is present. Periwound assessment is an important step of wound assessment before wound treatment is prescribed.

== Function and characteristics ==
Healthy periwound is an immediate barrier surrounding the wound bed that can perform all the regular functions of skin – the body's largest organ – such as absorption, excretion, protection, secretion, thermoregulation, pigment production, sensory perception and immunity. Healthy periwound maintains all the physical characteristics of skin: elasticity, surface integrity, color and texture. However, periwound can become compromised and negatively affect the healing progress of the wound.

== Periwound issues ==
Periwound issues affect the integrity and healthy functionality of the skin surrounding the wound and may include maceration, excoriation, dry (scaly) skin, eczema, callus (hyperkeratosis), infection, inflammation.

=== Signs and symptoms ===
Patients with periwound issues may experience burning, itching, tenderness, and pain. Visible and measurable signs include rash, erythema, discoloration, changes in skin texture and temperature.

=== Causes ===
The most common cause of periwound issues is excessive moisture present in the area surrounding the wound. Exudate from heavily draining wounds causes irritation of the periwound that may lead to maceration, excoriation, and otherwise compromise skin integrity.

This type of damage is more common in chronic wounds due to exudate composition which differs from fluids produced in acute wounds or burns. Chronic wound exudate contains proteolytic enzymes and other components that degrade skin integrity and predispose it to inflammation. Moisture-associated skin damage can also be caused by bodily fluids or other contaminants that enter the periwound areas, for example, in patients with urinary or fecal incontinence, or colostomy patients. Other causes include dryness of the skin due to ageing and skin or systemic disorders, allergic reactions to wound care products, damage that may result from poor application and removal technique of adhesive products used in wound treatment, as well as exposure to infection or extrinsic contaminants at the time of wound dressing changes.

=== Risk factors ===
Among risk factors that may contribute to degrading the periwound skin performance are:

- Chronic wounds (excessive harmful exudate)
- Old age (increased skin fragility, epidermal thinning, loss of elasticity)
- Underlying disorders (congenital (epidermolysis bullosa), dermatological conditions (eczema), fungal or bacterial infections, lymphedema)
- Environmental damage (UV radiation)
- Inadequate wound care regimens

=== Treatment and prevention ===
Treatment and prevention of periwound issues are becoming increasingly important as research continues to confirm the role of periwound in wound healing. The shared objective of treatment and prevention is maintenance and/or restoration of the integrity and healthy functionality of skin surrounding the wound.

Main treatment and prevention strategies include the following:

- Holistic wound assessment that includes periwound assessment.
- Elimination of factors causing moisture-associated skin damage.
- Maintaining optimal moisture balance over the wound and periwound: effective exudate management in heavily draining wounds as well as adequate hydration of dry wounds.
- Proper patient nutrition.
- Treatment of underlying conditions.
- Protection of periwound from damage, infection, and contaminants.

Systemic treatment may include medication appropriate for the patient's condition. Local treatment may include wound care products that protect periwound and help maintain its healthy functionality, for example, moisture barriers (ointments, salves and films), topical corticosteroids, antiseptics and antifungal agents, as well as moisture balancing dressings, such as self-adaptive wound dressing.
