= James R. Leininger =

American physician

- Born: 1944 (age 81–82); Warsaw, Indiana, U.S.
- Citizenship: United States
- Education: Indiana University Indianapolis (BA, MD)
- Occupations: Physician, founder of Kinetic Concepts
- Board member of: Patrick Henry College
- Spouse: Cecelia
- Children: 4

James Richard Leininger (born 1944) is an American physician, businessman and conservative and Christian activist from San Antonio, Texas.

== Early life and education ==
Leininger was born in Warsaw, Indiana, in 1944, and grew up in Indiana and Florida. He attended Indiana University Indianapolis, where he received a Bachelor of Arts in 1965 and a Doctor of Medicine in 1969.

He completed a two-year internship at the Miller School of Medicine at the University of Miami in Miami, and then post-graduate courses at the Center for Disease Control in Atlanta, the Brooke Army Medical Center in San Antonio, Walter Reed Army Institute of Research in Washington, D.C., and Fort Sam Houston in San Antonio, where he also lectured.

== Career ==
Leininger later settled in San Antonio, where he taught at the University of Texas Health Science Center in 1972 and 1973.

In 1976, Leininger founded Kinetic Concepts, a global medical technology corporation, where he later served as chairman emeritus. One of his Kinetic Concepts employees, Susan Weddington of San Antonio, was the state chairman of the Republican Party of Texas from 1997 to 2003.

His other business ventures include the private venture investment firm MedCare Investment Funds in 1991, the co-founding of ATX Technologies in 1994, where he later served on its board of directors, and co-founding the Renal Care Group in 1995. He served as director for the Emergency Department of the Baptist Health System in San Antonio from 1975 to 1985 and on the board of directors for Texas Commerce Bank from 1985 to 1991. He currently sits on the boards of BioNumerik Pharmaceuticals and Spurs Sports & Entertainment.

Leininger has invested in Florida real estate and food companies, including Promised Land Foods, Sunday House Foods, Seafood Wholesalers of Houston, and Plantation Seafood Co. He owns the direct mail firm Focus Direct, Inc. and the television station Mission City Television, Inc. He is a part-owner of the San Antonio Spurs.

He is a member of the American Medical Association, the Texas Medical Association, and the Institute of American Entrepreneurs. In 2007, he was inducted into the Texas Business Hall of Fame.

=== Political activism ===
Leininger founded Texans for Justice in 1988, the Texas Public Policy Foundation in 1989, a think tank which opposes the prevailing theory of climate change, and opposes the shift to sustainable mobility. Leininger has also been involved with Texans for Governmental Integrity. He supported Thomas R. Phillips' campaign for Chief Justice of the Texas Supreme Court and made significant donations to George W. Bush when he was governor of Texas), former Governor Rick Perry, and the state Republican Party.

=== Christian activism ===
Leininger is a self-described devout Christian and has been described as "an extremist" by his political opponents, a label which he describes as being "a sad commentary on where politics is today." Tex Lezar, a 1994 Republican nominee for Texas lieutenant governor, has said of Leininger that "[h]e believes in putting his time, effort and money behind things he believes in[.] . . . I've never sensed an ulterior motive for Jim. It's all philosophical."

Leininger sits on the board of Patrick Henry College, founded in Virginia by the conservative activist Michael Farris. A proponent of school vouchers, Leininger launched CEO San Antonio to award vouchers to children from modest backgrounds. He also sits on the board of directors of CEO America, another school voucher organization. He is a former board member of the Carver Academy. He owned the copyright for The Beginner's Bible, as well.

He sat on the advisory board of the Institute in Basic Life Principles.

=== Philanthropy ===
In addition to political contributions, Leininger supports a range of charitable initiatives in education, humanitarian aid, and scientific research. In 1997, he reportedly donated $1.5 million to Vanderbilt University, $2.5 million to Vision Forum, $3 million to the University of Miami, and $300,000 for diabetes research to the University of Texas Medical Center. Other recipients include Boy Scouts of America, Habitat for Humanity, the American Red Cross, the Mental Health Association, YMCA, The Miracle Foundation, and orphanages in Africa, Central America, Haiti, India, Myanmar, Romania, Russia, Thailand, and Ukraine.

=== Personal life ===
Married in 1976, Leininger and his wife, Cecelia, have four children and five grandchildren.
