= Wound assessment =

Component of wound management

Wound assessment is a component of wound management. As far as may be practical, the assessment is to be accomplished before prescribing any treatment plan. The objective is to collect information about the patient and about the wound, that may be relevant to planning and implementing the treatment.

== Wound assessment principles ==
Wound assessment includes observation of the wound, surveying the patient, as well as identifying relevant clinical data from physical examination and patient's health history. Clinical data recorded during an initial assessment serves as a baseline for prescribing the appropriate treatment.

=== TIME framework and Triangle of Wound Assessment (TWA) ===
To assist clinicians in standardizing the wound assessment and preparation of wound bed for treatment, the TIME framework was developed in 2002 by a group of wound care experts. The TIME acronym stands for Tissue, Infection/Inflammation, Moisture, and Edge – components that, per the TIME recommendation, should be thoroughly assessed to optimize the treatment. Depending on the clinical findings for each component, TIME recommends certain clinical actions aimed at correcting the issues and facilitating healing.

A recent global anthropological study has prompted clinicians to review the TIME framework and resulted in a 2016 development of a comprehensive tool for wound assessment – the Triangle of Wound Assessment (TWA). Based on the study's findings, TWA identifies three zones (wound bed, wound edge, and periwound skin) that must be included in wound assessment to arrive at clinical decisions that will help heal the wound in the most efficient way. TIME framework components are integrated into the assessment of each zone.

The introduction of periwound skin as a component of wound assessment identifies a significant departure from traditional methods; it emphasizes the importance of addressing periwound skin during treatment in the same measure as wound bed and wound edge.

Wound assessment is a holistic process that considers the patient's current state of health, the factors that may impede wound healing, and the cause, duration and state of the wound. As such, this process is applicable to any wound.

== Wound assessment components ==
=== Health history ===
A patient's health history may include disorders that affect the body's ability to heal itself. These disorders are called comorbidities and may interfere with circulatory and metabolic body functions, levels of various physiological assessment components (sugar, albumin, etc.), and induce other factors that negatively affect the healing. Common co-morbidities are: diabetes, venous insufficiency or peripheral arterial disease, respiratory and cardiovascular disorders, malignancies and autoimmune disorders.

=== Impeding factors ===
Among other factors that may impede the healing of a wound are:

- patient's age
- obesity
- presence of infection
- poor nutrition or hydration
- prescribed medication
- substance abuse and smoking
- general effect of the wound on a patient's lifestyle (pain, wound odor, excessive drainage)

== Wound ==
=== Wound cause ===
If the wound is chronic, is it the result of: an underlying illness (diabetic, venous and arterial ulcers), poor handling of the patient (pressure injuries, deep tissue injuries, wounds with cavities and undermining), poor previous treatment choices that slowed down the healing (untreated infection, inappropriate wound care product choice, lack of necessary procedures). If the wound is acute, is it the result of: traumatic injury, burn, or surgery.

=== Wound duration ===
For chronic wounds: time the current wound has been present, is it a recurring wound, how many times it has recurred in the past, how long it took to heal each time. For acute wounds: when the wound was first acquired before the clinician visit.

=== Wound state ===
Wound bed, wound edge and periwound skin should be examined before the initial treatment plan is devised. It should also be re-assessed at each visit or each dressing change.

For wound bed, the following parameters are assessed:

- Tissue type; presence and percentage of non-viable tissue covering the wound bed
- Level of exudate
- Presence of infection

Wound edge must be examined to detect:

- Maceration
- Desiccation
- Undermining
- Elevation above surrounding tissue (raised edge)
- Epibole (rolled edge)

For periwound skin, the following conditions should be diagnosed or ruled out:

- Maceration
- Dry, scaly skin
- Desiccation
- Excoriation and skin stripping
- Hypergranulation and hyperkeratosis
- Eczema
- Callus build-up and epibole
- Infection and inflammation
