= Acelity =

Privately held medical device company

Acelity, L.P. Inc.
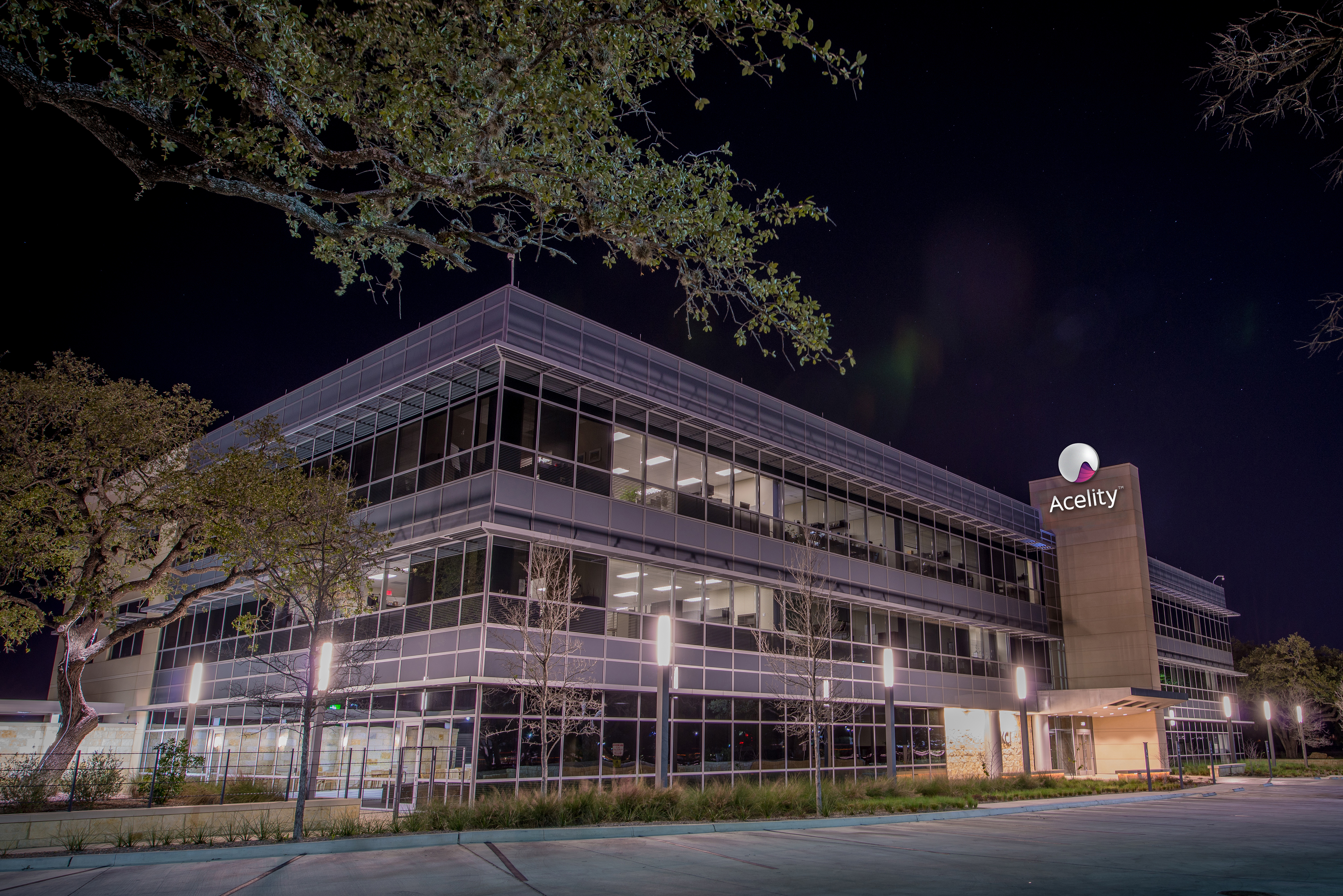
- Global headquarters in San Antonio, Texas
- Type: Subsidiary of 3M
- Industry: Medical equipment
- Founded: 1976
- Fate: Subsidiary
- Headquarters: San Antonio, Texas
- Website: acelity.com

Acelity L.P. Inc., was a privately held medical device company. It was a non-operating holding company whose wholly owned subsidiaries developed advanced wound therapeutics products. The advanced wound therapeutics business was conducted by Kinetic Concepts, Inc. (KCI) and its subsidiaries, including Systagenix.

In October 2019 Acelity Inc. and its KCI subsidiaries worldwide were acquired by 3M.

== History ==
Acelity began as Kinetic Concepts Inc., a medical technology company founded in 1976 by Dr. Jim Leininger, an emergency room physician in San Antonio, Texas. Initially the company's product development focused on therapeutic beds and surfaces then expanded to introduce V.A.C. Therapy, the first commercial negative pressure wound therapy products in the mid-1990s. In 2016, more than 10 million wounds were treated with V.A.C. Therapy worldwide since its introduction.

In 1999, KCI Therapeutic Services became KCI USA, Inc.

Acelity registered for an IPO in August 2015 before withdrawing the registration December. The company announced it had filed another registration in April 2019.

In April 2017, Acelity announced R. Andrew Eckert would replace Joseph Woody as chief executive and president.

KCI stock was traded on the NYSE until 1997, when the company went private. In February 2004, KCI became a publicly listed company for the second time and was listed on the NYSE under the ticker symbol KCI.

== Mergers and acquisitions ==
Early 1990s: KCI detailed its operations into four divisions: KCI New Technologies, Inc. (Nutech—organized in 1992 focused on lower-cost technologies), KCI Home Care (organized in 1995 focused on selling wholesale to home medical equipment providers), KCI Therapeutic Services, Inc. (KCTS—rented specialty beds to patients or to hospitals), and KCI International (KCII—organized in 1991 focused on providing the services and products of KCI to foreign countries, including most of Western Europe, Scandinavia, and Australia).

1990: KCI purchased Medirec for $26 million in cash and $10 million in KCI securities, forming KCI's Medical Services Division. KCI later sold KCI Medical Services in September 1994 for $65.3 million in cash and $18.8 million in promissory notes.

1991: KCI purchased Mediscus International, a British competitor in the specialty bed business. The transaction brought KCI products into 10 countries and formed the KCI International subsidiary.

1996: KCI purchased U.K.-based Astec Medical Ltd. The acquisition added four new products to KCI International's product line and allowed KCI to expand its market share in the U.K. community segment.

1997: KCI acquired the Ethos Medical Group. Later that year, Equitron Manufacturing was acquired, adding bariatric products to the Home Care offerings at KCI.

In 2008, the company acquired LifeCell, a company specializing in regenerative medicine, in a non-hostile transaction for US$1.7 billion.

KCI acquired Systagenix Wound Management, formerly Johnson & Johnson's professional wound care business, in 2013 for $485 million.

KCI's parent company announced in September 2014 that KCI, LifeCell and Systagenix would operate under one global medical technology brand known as Acelity. That same year, Acelity acquired exclusive worldwide rights from the GID Group, Inc. to develop, manufacture and commercialize the REVOLVE System, a fat processing technology used in both reconstructive and cosmetic procedures to facilitate high-volume, autologous fat grafting. LifeCell previously held exclusive rights to distribute the REVOLVE System in the US and Canada since 2013.

Acelity acquired the SNAP business from Spiracur, Inc. in 2015.

Acelity announced a definitive agreement with Allergan for the acquisition of the company's LifeCell business unit for $2.9 billion in cash in December 2016. The sale was completed by February 2017.

Acelity and its KCI subsidiaries worldwide were acquired in 2019 by 3M for $6.7 billion, including assumption of debt and other adjustments.
