= Intermittent vacuum therapy =

Medical treatment

- Specialty: Cardiovascular

The intermittent vacuum therapy (IVT) is a treatment conducted in case of venous and arterial issues as well as in rehabilitation (after sports injuries and vascular complaints). With the aid of normal and low pressure, it should enable to control venous reflux, enhance lymphatic flow and improve blood flow in periphery and muscles.

== Technology ==
The IVT treatment device consists of a cylindrical space in which the lower body of a lying patient (up until the ribs) is enclosed and affected. The legs are fully comprised. In the waist region, the inner space of the device is sealed by means of a lens. Within the cubicle, a vacuum pump alternatingly generates intermittent normal and low pressure (-20 until -70 mbar). The devices are declared medical devices (Class IIa. CE 0123).

== Mode of operation ==
Through the generation of low pressure, blood circulation within the lower body parts and the abdomen is encouraged, meaning that arterial perfusion is stimulated. This blood flow leads to a reduction of hypertension within the central line, stroke volume, cardiac output and eventually to a reduction of the arterial blood flow which is counteracted through the compensation mechanisms. As a reaction to this change, pulse and peripheral vascular resistance are enhanced. In addition, shearforces are effective and the sympathetic answer of the heart is activated. Blood volume is adapted to the change of pressure within the lower part of the body. The flow of oxygenized blood within the legs and lower extremities is encouraged and enhanced through the changed conditions of normal and low pressure. During the phase of normal pressure, the backflow of venous blood and lymph within the large vessels is facilitated. Through that, the IVT has a strong physiological effect on the “removal of lymphatic waste products”, in other words a lymphatic drainage takes place. The related raise in pH value often entails a strengthening of the connective tissue, leading to an increase of collagen synthesis as well as to improved fat reduction.

The treatment was developed on basis of the LBNPD-method of the NASA (lower body negative pressure device). In 1999, the development of the intermittent variant of the LBNPD started as a neurolab research project at the institute of aerospace medicine of the German Aerospace Centre (DLR) in Cologne.

== Physiological mechanism ==
Intermittent vacuum therapy influences the hemodynamics of the lower extremities through periodic changes in external pressure. The alternation between negative pressure and normal pressure leads to rhythmic changes in vessel diameter and to alterations in local blood flow velocity. As a result, changes in venous and capillary blood flow as well as in transmural pressure across the vessel walls may occur.

The flow alterations generated by these pressure changes produce mechanical forces on the vascular wall, known as shear stress. Shear stress is considered an important physiological stimulus for the vascular endothelium. Experimental and clinical studies indicate that increased shear stress may contribute to the activation of endothelial signaling pathways. Among other mechanisms, this can involve activation of endothelial nitric oxide synthase, resulting in increased release of nitric oxide. Nitric oxide plays a key role in the regulation of vascular tone, endothelial function and microcirculation.

Changes in local blood flow and shear stress are also regarded as important mechanisms in the adaptation of blood vessels to hemodynamic stimuli. Studies on flow-mediated dilation suggest that alterations in shear conditions play a central role in the regulation of vascular function.

Studies investigating intermittent negative pressure applied to the lower limbs further suggest that such pressure changes may influence both macrovascular and microvascular circulation.

Hemodynamic forces, particularly shear stress generated by blood flow, play a central role in endothelial function. Changes in flow patterns influence endothelial signaling pathways and are closely linked to the regulation of vascular tone and microcirculatory perfusion.

== Clinical relevance of microcirculation ==
Microcirculation plays a central role in the delivery of oxygen and nutrients to tissues and in the removal of metabolic waste products. The microvascular network, consisting of arterioles, capillaries and venules, represents the primary site of exchange between blood and tissues. Proper microvascular perfusion is therefore essential for maintaining normal cellular metabolism and tissue function.

Disturbances of microcirculation have been associated with a variety of pathological conditions, including cardiovascular disease, diabetes mellitus, impaired wound healing and age-related vascular dysfunction. Alterations in endothelial signaling, blood flow regulation and capillary recruitment are considered important mechanisms contributing to these disorders.

Therapeutic approaches aimed at improving microvascular blood flow are therefore of interest in several fields of medicine, including vascular medicine, rehabilitation and sports medicine. Interventions that modify local hemodynamic conditions and shear stress may contribute to changes in endothelial function and tissue perfusion.

== Treatment ==
The average treatment duration, according to indication, amounts to 4 to > 10 applications (30–45 minutes). There are numerous indications for the intermittent vacuum therapy, however you still find a great need for research since findings are not always distinct enough. Indications are amongst others: Connective tissue weakness, overacidification, cellulite and spider veins, injuries (e.g. bruises or sports injuries), vascular diseases, oedemata and ulcers. Further indications which are already treated in the Netherlands are RSI syndrome, CTS (carpal tunnel syndrome), CRPS and the Raynaud syndrome. No blindstudies available.

== Contraindications ==
Negative effects could not be detected until now. Nevertheless, the IVT should not be conducted in case of acute injuries such as phlebothrombosis, thrombophlebitis, infections or pregnancy.

== See also ==
- Negative-pressure wound therapy
- Manual lymphatic drainage
- Pressure
- Edema
