= Coniferous resin salve =

Wound treatment method

Spruce resin salve is a traditional wound treatment method that has gained new popularity again after clinical studies in the 21st century. The pure coniferous resin from Norway spruce is antimicrobial against a wide range of bacteria and fungi and positively associates with progressive healing of the wound. The improvement is not limited to the healing of the infected wounds only, suggesting that the resin has positive influences on mechanisms that play a role in wound repair.

== History ==
The first reports of using resins or rosins in medicine are from antiquity. Resins have been used for nearly every kind of human disorder and disease. First medical publication of the use of coniferous resin in medical practice in Finland is from 1578. Swedish physician Benedictus Olai wrote about natural resin in treatment of old leg wounds in the first medical textbook of the Swedish kingdom. Elias Lönnrot presented the first recipe for resin salve in the Flora Fennica book 1866.

== Biological effects ==
Natural resin is a complex composition of components such as resin acids, lignans and coumaric acid. The levels of these components are dependent on what type of coniferous tree resin it is and when it is collected i.e. fresh physiological resin or matured resin collected from trunk of the tree

== Contra indications ==
Persons allergic to resin acids should not use these types of product since it may cause them to develop a topical skin rash. One unselected general population study of 793 Danish adults in 1992 shows a prevalence of colophony allergy of 0.4% in men and 1.0% in women.
