= Corona phlebectatica =

Bulging veins around the ankle, indicating pooling of blood (venuous insufficiency)

- Differential diagnosis: chronic venous insufficiency

Corona phlebectatica is a cutaneous sign of chronic venous insufficiency, characterized by abnormally dilated veins around the ankle. It is characterised by the presence of abnormally visible cutaneous blood vessels at the ankle with (a) venous cups, (b) blue and red telangiectasis, and (c) capillary stasis spots. It was proposed that the presence of corona phlebectatica be included in current clinical classifications of chronic venous disorders.
