= Malignant ulcer =

Malignant ulcer may refer to:

- Carcinomatous ulcer, an ulcer with cancerous pathology behind it
- Rodent ulcer, also known as basal cell carcinoma
- Melanotic ulcer
- A historical term for necrotizing fasciitis
