= George D. Winter =

British-born pioneer of moist wound healing

Dr. George D. Winter (1927–1981) was the British-born pioneer of moist wound healing. In 1962, while working at the Department of Biomechanics and Surgical Materials at the University of London, Winter published his landmark Nature paper Formation of the scab and the rate of epithelisation of superficial wounds in the skin of the young domestic pig (Nature 193:293 1962) where he demonstrated that, contrary to the conventional wisdom that wounds should be allowed to dry out and form scabs to promote healing, wounds instead healed faster if kept moist. Winter formed multiple partial thickness wounds on the backs of pigs, half left open to the air and half covered with a polymer film to keep them hydrated. The latter wounds healed faster, as measured by the migration of new epithelium on the wound bed. This work began the evolution of modern wound dressings that promote moist wound healing.

George D. Winter was the first president of the European Society for Biomaterials and has an annual award named after him.
