= Negative-pressure wound therapy =

Therapeutic technique

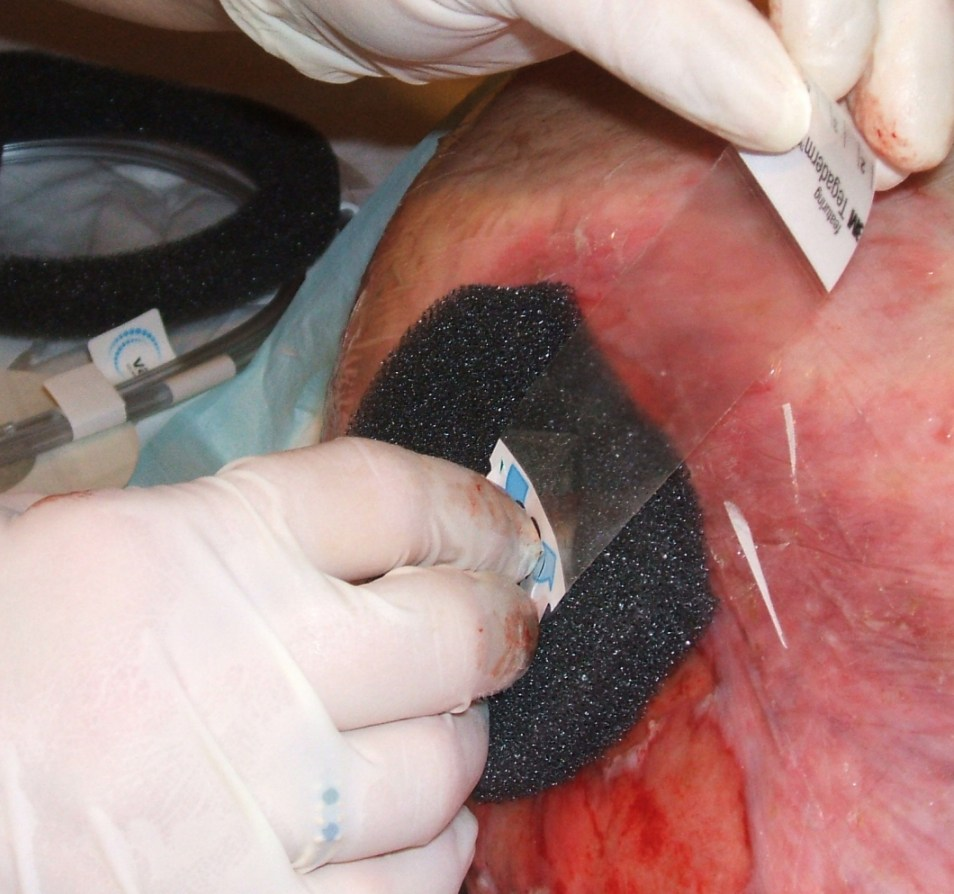
- Application of a vacuum pump using a foam dressing to a wound
- Other names: Vacuum assisted closure

Negative pressure wound therapy device

Negative-pressure wound therapy (NPWT), also known as a vacuum assisted closure (VAC), is a therapeutic technique using a suction pump, tubing, and a dressing to remove excess wound exudate and to promote healing in acute or chronic wounds and second- and third-degree burns. The use of this technique in wound management started in the 1990s and this technique is often recommended for treatment of a range of wounds including dehisced surgical wounds, closed surgical wounds, open abdominal wounds, open fractures, pressure injuries or pressure ulcers, diabetic foot ulcers, venous insufficiency ulcers, some types of skin grafts, burns, and sternal wounds. It may also be considered after a clean surgery in a person who is obese.

NPWT is performed by applying a sub-atmospheric vacuum through a special sealed dressing. The continued vacuum draws out fluid from the wound and increases blood flow to the area. The vacuum may be applied continuously or intermittently, depending on the type of wound being treated and the clinical objectives. Typically, the dressing is changed two to three times per week. The dressings used for the technique include foam dressings, sealed with an occlusive dressing intended to contain the vacuum at the wound site. Where NPWT devices allow delivery of fluids, such as saline or antibiotics to irrigate the wound, intermittent removal of used fluid supports the cleaning and drainage of the wound bed.

In 1995, Kinetic Concepts was the first company to have a NPWT product cleared by the US Food and Drug Administration. Following increased use of the technique by hospitals in the US, the procedure was approved for reimbursement by the Centers for Medicare and Medicaid Services in 2001.

== Technique ==
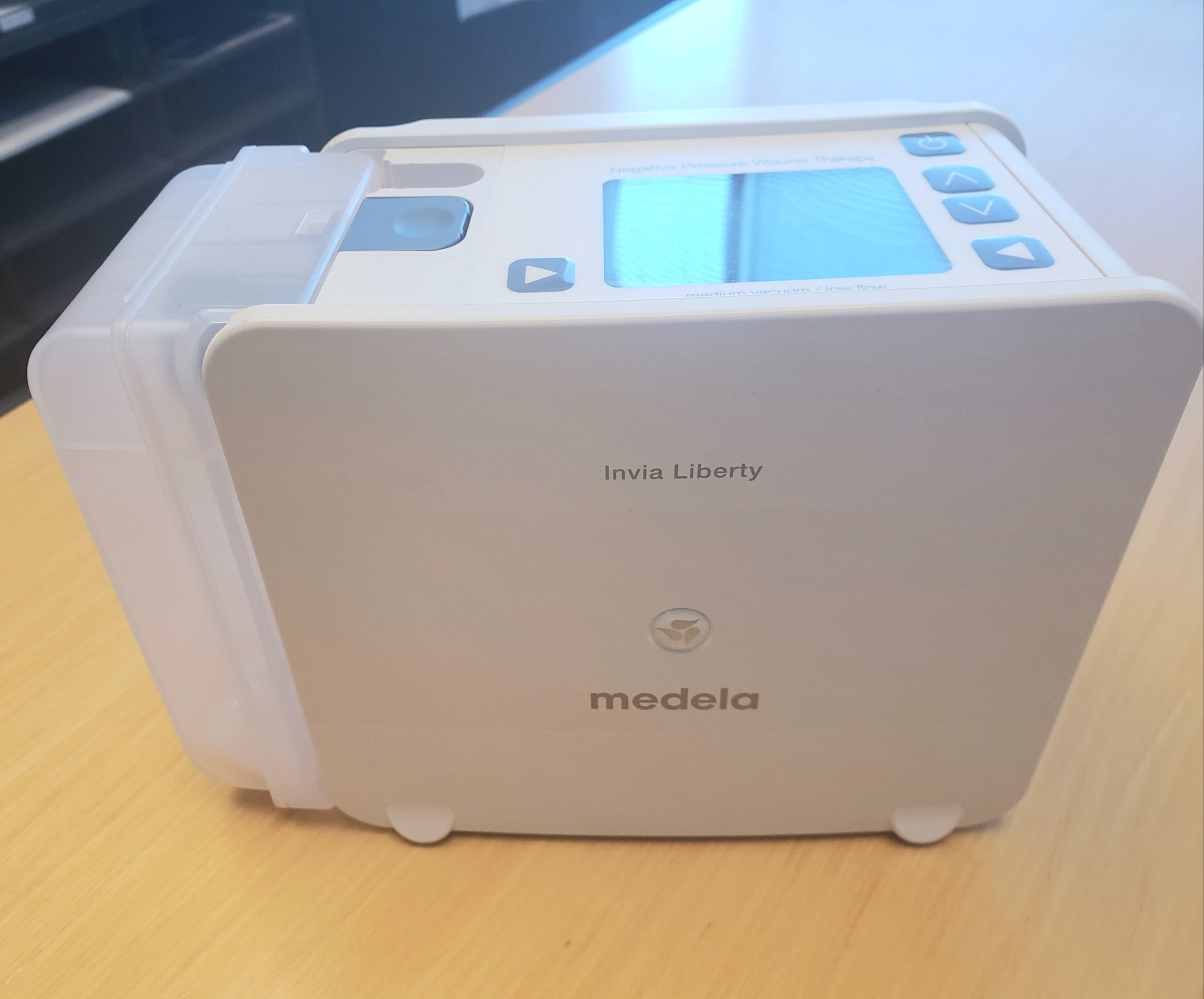
Pump used to create negative pressure

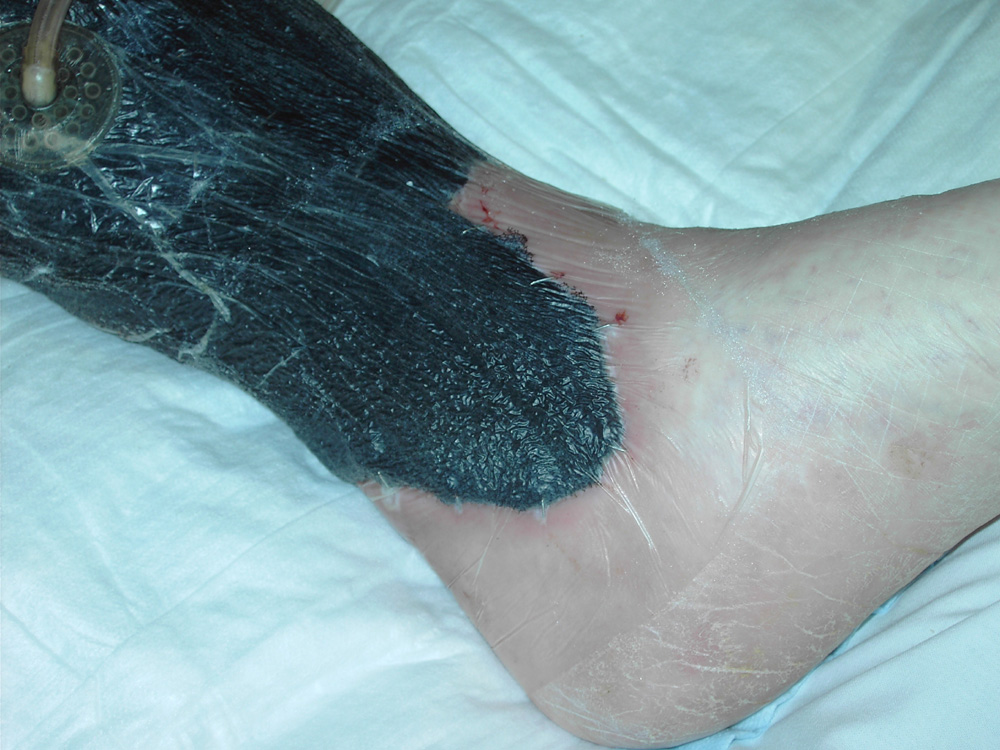
An example of a vacuum bandage

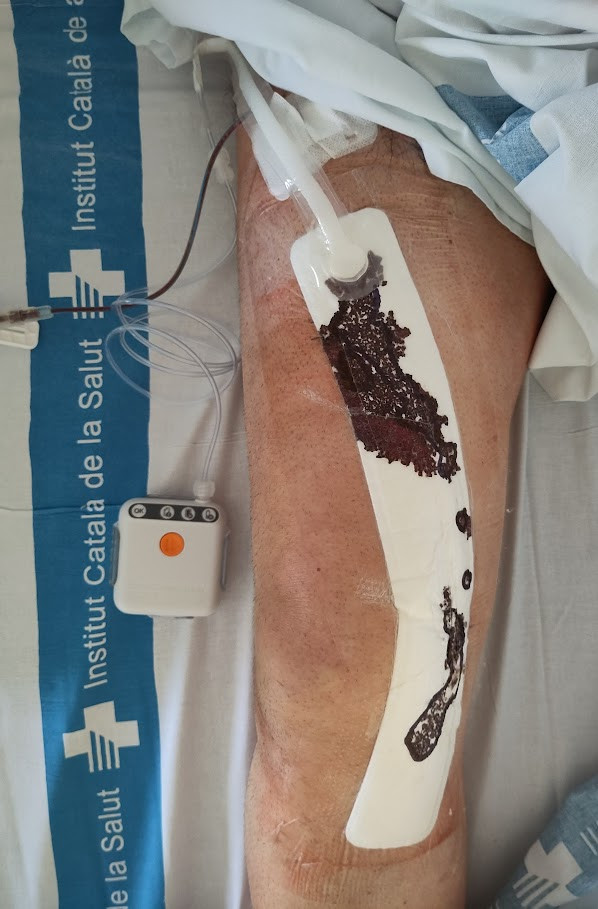
Negative pressure system used in a surgical wound in the right knee and thigh. The little vacuum pump is shown on the left of the photo, as is a subcutaneous drain.

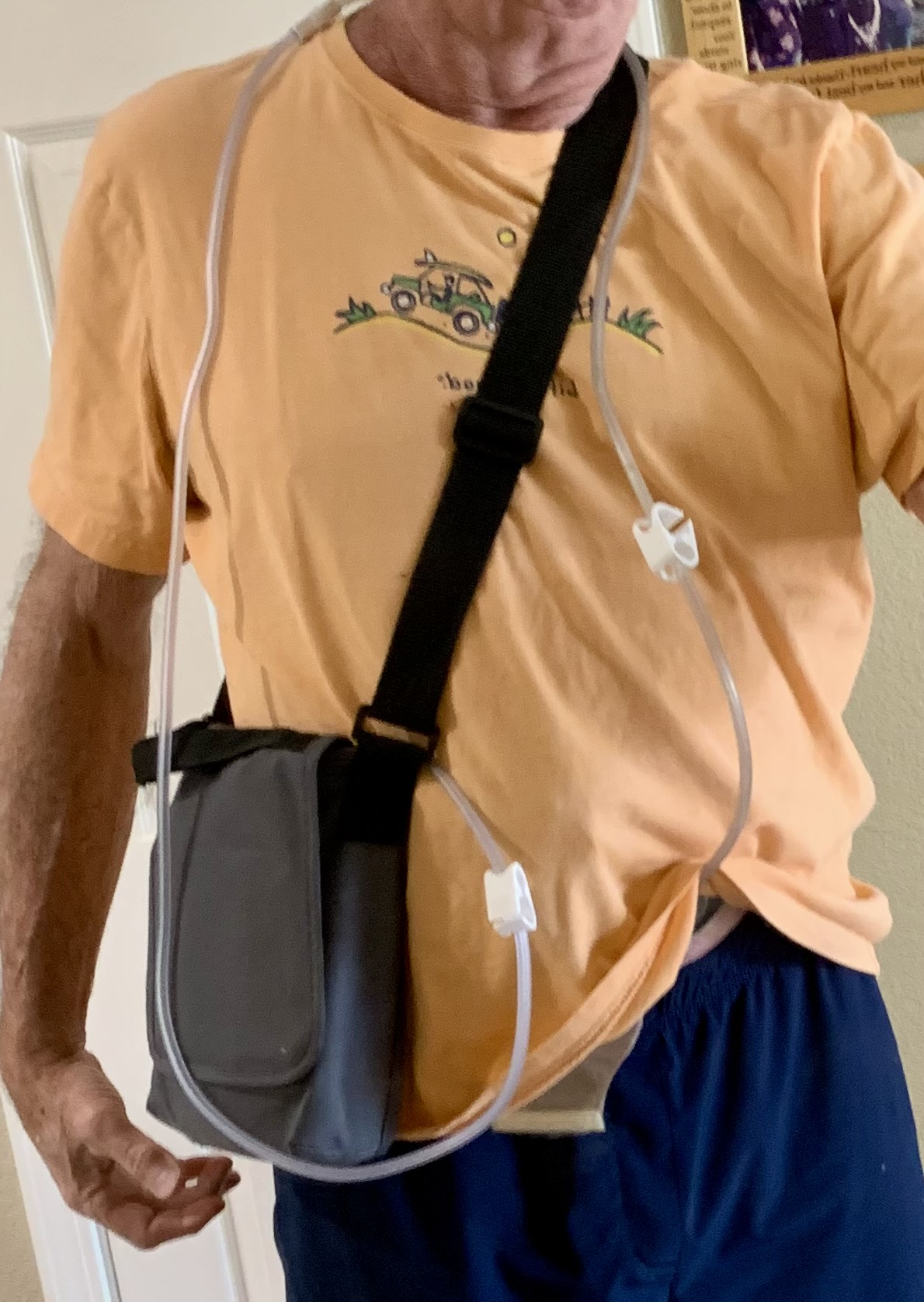
Man with a wound vacuum (negative-pressure wound therapy) with slightly visible colostomy bag

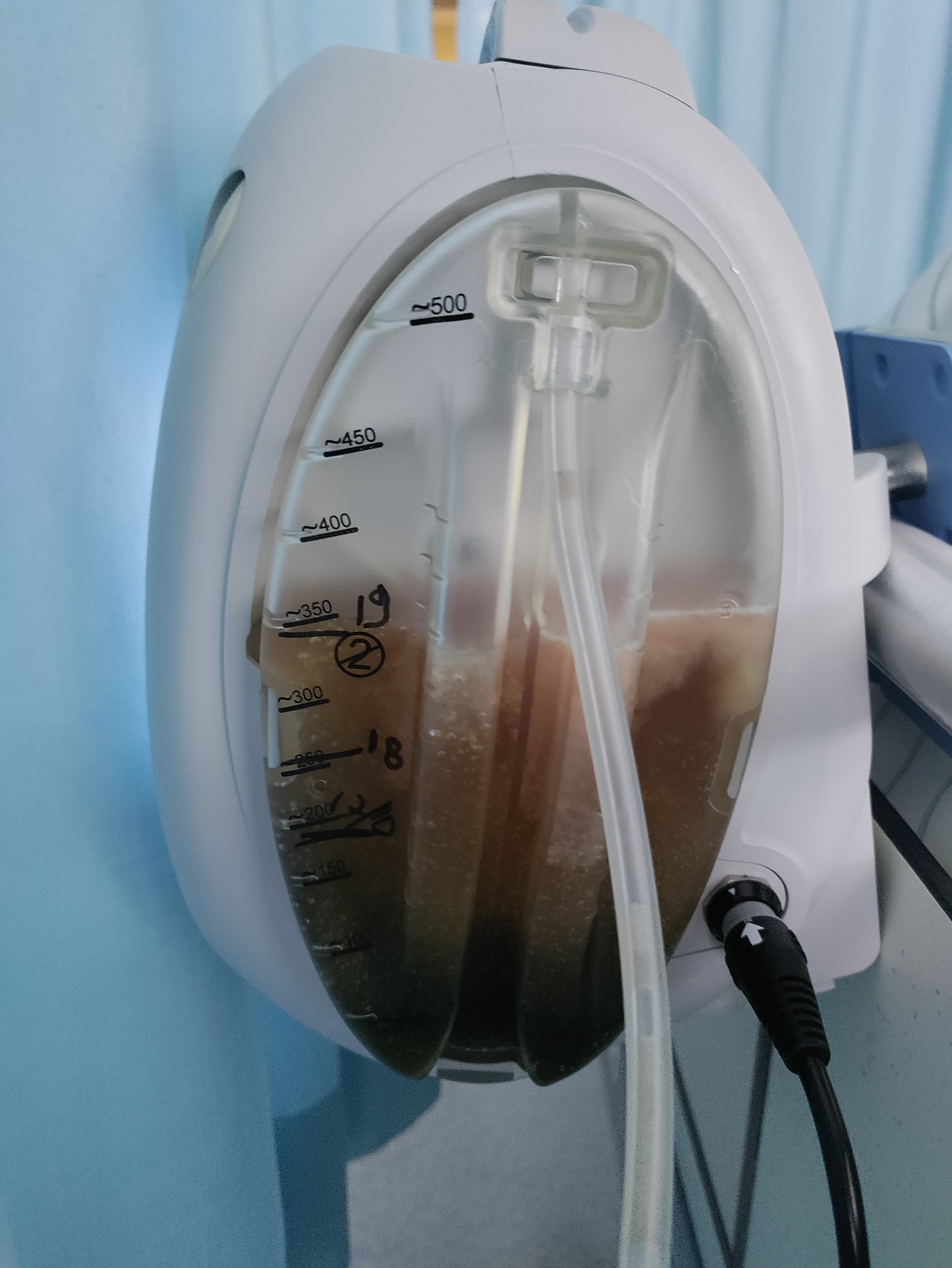
Fluid drained from wound

General technique for NPWT is as follows: A dressing or filler material is fitted to the contours of a wound to protect the periwound and the overlying foam or gauze is then sealed with a transparent film. A drainage tube is then connected to the dressing through an opening of the transparent film. Tubing is connected through an opening in the film drape to a canister on the side of a vacuum pump. This turns an open wound into a controlled, closed wound with an airtight seal while removing excess fluid from the wound bed to enhance circulation and remove wound fluids. This creates a moist healing environment and reduces edema.

There are four types of dressings used over the wound surface: foam or gauze, a transparent film, and a non-adherent (woven or non-woven) contact layer if necessary. Foam dressings or woven gauze are used to fill open cavity wounds. Foam can be cut to size to fit wounds. Once the wound is filled, then a transparent film is applied over the top to create a seal around the dressing. The tubing is then attached and connected to the pump.

Once the dressing is sealed, the vacuum pump can be set to deliver continuous or intermittent pressures, with levels of pressure depending on the device used, varying between −200 and −40 mmHg depending on the material used and patient tolerance. Pressure can be applied constantly or intermittently.

The dressing type used depends on the type of wound, clinical objectives and patient. For pain sensitive patients with shallow or irregular wounds, wounds with undermining or explored tracts or tunnels, gauze may be used, while foam may be cut easily to fit a patient's wound that has a regular contour and perform better when aggressive granulation formation and wound contraction is the desired goal.

=== Contraindications ===
Contraindications for NPWT use include:

1. Malignancy in the wound
2. Untreated osteomyelitis
3. Non enteric and unexplored fistulas
4. Necrotic tissue with eschar present
5. Exposed blood vessels, anastomotic sites, organs and nerves in the periwound area (must avoid direct foam contact with these structures)

== Effectiveness ==
Negative pressure wound therapy is usually used with chronic wounds or wounds that are expected to present difficulties while healing (such as those associated with diabetes). Negative pressure wound therapy is approved by the FDA and numerous randomized controlled trials have been conducted on this technique, however, the evidence supporting how effective NPWT is compared to standard wound care dressings is not clear. Low-level evidence indicates that there may be a lower risk of death and less surgical site infections associated with NPWT compared to standard dressing care, however there may not be a difference in the risk of wound reopening when comparing the two approaches. NPWT may increase the risk of skin blistering compared to standard wound care. NPWT may be a more cost effective approach for closing wounds following a caesarean section in women who are obese, however, NPWT is not likely as cost effective for closing wounds associated with fracture surgeries. It is not clear if NPWT is cost effective for closing wounds associated with other types of surgery. NPWT has been used to treat non-trauma patients after abdominal surgery. Non-trauma patients are people who might need surgery for conditions such as abdominal infections or cancer. However, it is still not clear how safe and effective NPWT is for treating non-trauma patients with open abdomens.

For treating diabetic ulcers of the feet, "consistent evidence of the benefit of NPWT" in the treatment of diabetic ulcers of the feet has been reported. Results for bedsores were conflicting and research on mixed wounds was of poor quality, but promising. There is no evidence of increased significant complications. The review concluded "There is now sufficient evidence to show that NPWT is safe, and will accelerate healing, to justify its use in the treatment of diabetes-associated chronic leg wounds. There is also evidence, though of poor quality, to suggest that healing of other wounds may also be accelerated."

=== Mechanism ===
The use of NPWT to enhance wound healing is thought to be by removing excess extracellular fluid and decreasing tissue edema, which leads to increased blood flow and stabilization of the wound environment. A reduction in systemic (e.g. interleukins, monocytes) and local mediators of inflammation has been demonstrated in experimental models, while decreased matrix metalloproteinase activity and bacterial burden have been documented clinically. In vivo, NPWT has been shown to increase fibroblast proliferation and migration, collagen organization, and to increase the expression of vascular endothelial growth factor and fibroblast growth factor-2, thereby enhancing wound healing.

== See also ==
- Intermittent vacuum therapy
