= Sulodexide =

Pharmaceutical drug

Clinical data
- AHFS/Drugs.com: International Drug Names
- Routes of administration: Oral, Subcutaneous, Intravenous, Intramuscular
- ATC code: B01AB11 (WHO)

Identifiers
- IUPAC name: Glucurono-2-amino-2-deoxyglucoglucan sulfate
- CAS Number: 57821-29-1
- DrugBank: DB06271
- UNII: 75HGV0062C
- KEGG: D08547

Sulodexide, traded as Aterina, is a highly purified mixture of glycosaminoglycans composed of heparan sulfate (80%) and dermatan sulfate (20%).

== Pharmacology ==
The low molecular weight of both sulodexide fractions allows for extensive oral absorption compared to unfractionated heparin. The pharmacological effects of sulodexide differ substantially from other glycosaminoglycans and are mainly characterized by a prolonged half-life and reduced effect on global coagulation and bleeding parameters. Due to the presence of both glycosaminoglycan fractions, sulodexide potentiates the antiprotease activities of both antithrombin III and heparin cofactor II simultaneously.

== Uses ==
Clinically, sulodexide is used for the prophylaxis and treatment of thromboembolic diseases. Research has also demonstrated the beneficial effects of sulodexide in animal models of reperfusion injury and the treatment of diabetic nephropathy. In combination with melatonin, sulodexide has been shown to be a viable treatment option for patients suffering from central or sensorineural tinnitus. There have also been positive results in treating tinnitus using sulodexide as a monotherapy. Sulodexide has also been effectively used in the treatment of chronic venous disease.
