= Support surface =

Material that supports people who are bedridden

Support surface is any material, such as a mattress, that supports people who are bed-ridden through illness. Research and development of appropriate support surfaces can alleviate some of the complications of immobility, such as bedsores and respiratory problems.

The National Pressure Ulcer Advisory Panel's (NPUAP) Support Surface Standards Initiative (S3I) has released the first version of its Terms and Definitions Document. This set of definitions is provided in an attempt to redefine commonly used and confused terms. The terms describe support surface features, components, categories, and performance characteristics.

== Problems of immobility ==
As long as people have been bed-ridden through illness, they are subject to the complications of immobility.

These include, but are not limited to:

- Disorders of the skin and underlying tissue.
- Pneumonia and other related respiratory illnesses.
- Disorders of the renal and gastrointestinal systems.
- Disruption in the cognitive systems resulting in neuro-psychological disorders.

Critically ill patients, unable to move spontaneously, are nursed in the supine position for extended periods of time. This is in striking contrast to people who are healthy and mobile who, even during sleep, change their position approximately every 11.6 min–a phenomenon described by Keane as "minimum physiological mobility requirement." The deleterious effects of prolonged immobilization affect the heart, vascular system, musculoskeletal system, skin, and kidneys, despite the usual nursing practice of repositioning every two hours.

== Traditional methods of dealing with immobility ==
The traditional method of dealing with immobility is to turn the patient at least every two hours, following a side-back-side protocol. Through the years, many mechanical systems have been improvised to prevent these complications of immobility:

- Sheepskin laid on top of the patient's mattress.
- Foam mattresses and overlays.
- Non-powered and powered air mattresses.
