= Venous ulcer =

Skin sore sustained by a vasculatory disease

- Other names: Venous insufficiency ulceration, stasis ulcer, stasis dermatitis, varicose ulcer, ulcus cruris, crural ulceration
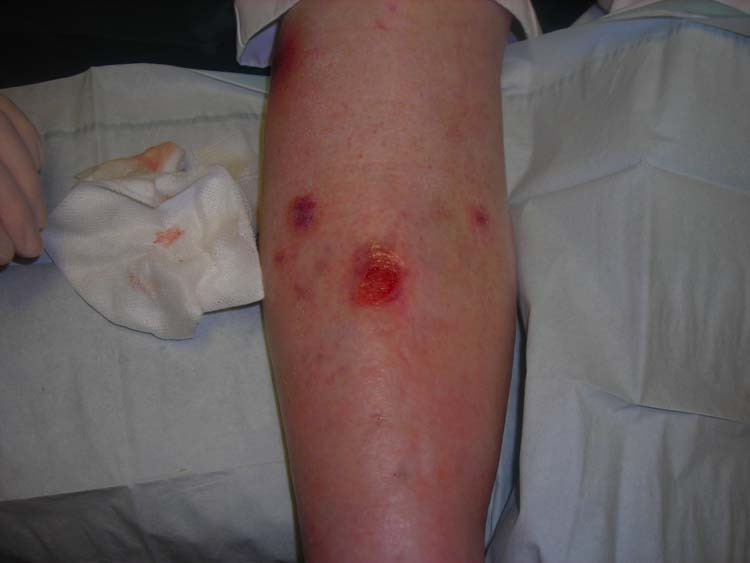
- Venous ulcer on the back of the right leg
- Specialty: Dermatology

Venous ulcer is defined by the American Venous Forum as "a full-thickness defect of skin, most frequently in the ankle region, that fails to heal spontaneously and is sustained by chronic venous disease, based on venous duplex ultrasound testing." Venous ulcers are wounds that are thought to occur due to improper functioning of venous valves, usually of the legs (hence leg ulcers). They are an important cause of chronic wounds, affecting 1% of the population. Venous ulcers develop mostly along the medial distal leg, and can be painful with negative effects on quality of life.

Exercise, together with compression stockings, increases healing. The NICE guideline recommends that everyone with a venous leg ulcer, even if healed, should be referred to a vascular specialist for venous duplex ultrasound and assessment for endovenous surgery.

== Signs and symptoms ==
Signs and symptoms of venous ulcers include:

- Moderate pain, which improves on elevation (unlike arterial ulcers which worsen with elevation)
- Irregular, sloping edges
- Associated oedema, due to increased hydrostatic pressure, which contributes to 'atrophie blanche'
- 'Atrophie blanche', localised loss of skin pigmentation due to death of erythrocytes and scarring
- Lipodermatosclerosis, a hardening of the skin which can lead to an "inverted champagne bottle" appearance to the leg
- Associated superficial varicose veins or "ankle flare", a collection of small, dark, engorged superficial veins
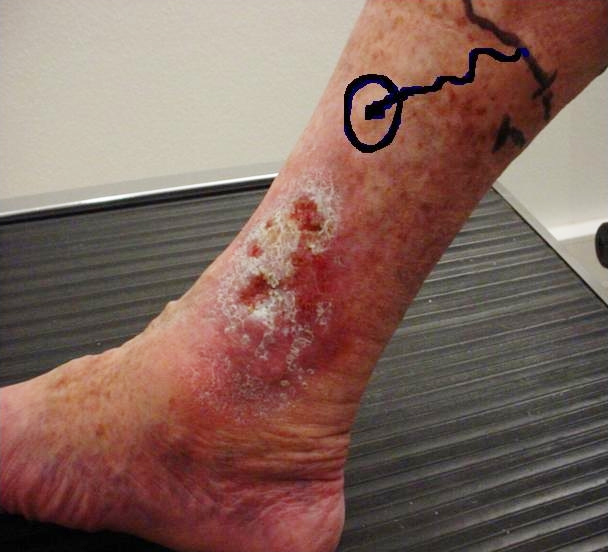
Venous ulcer before surgery

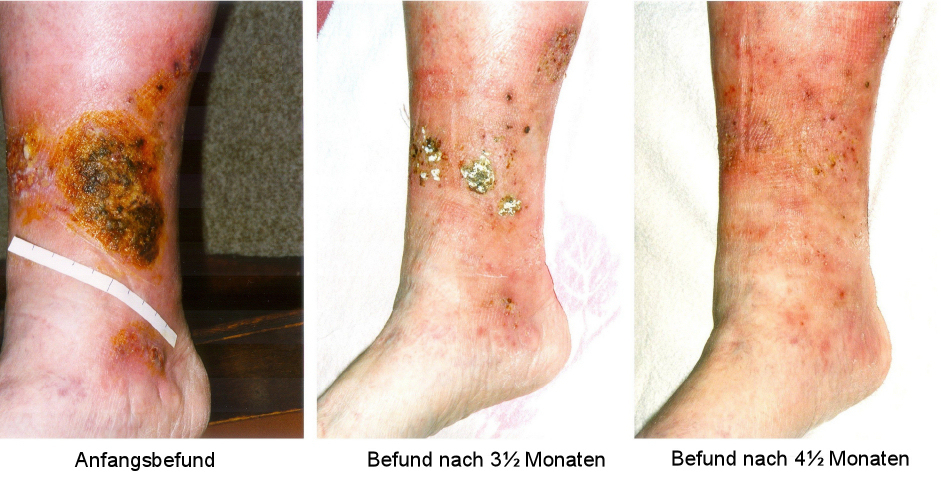
Healing process of a chronic venous stasis ulcer of the lower leg

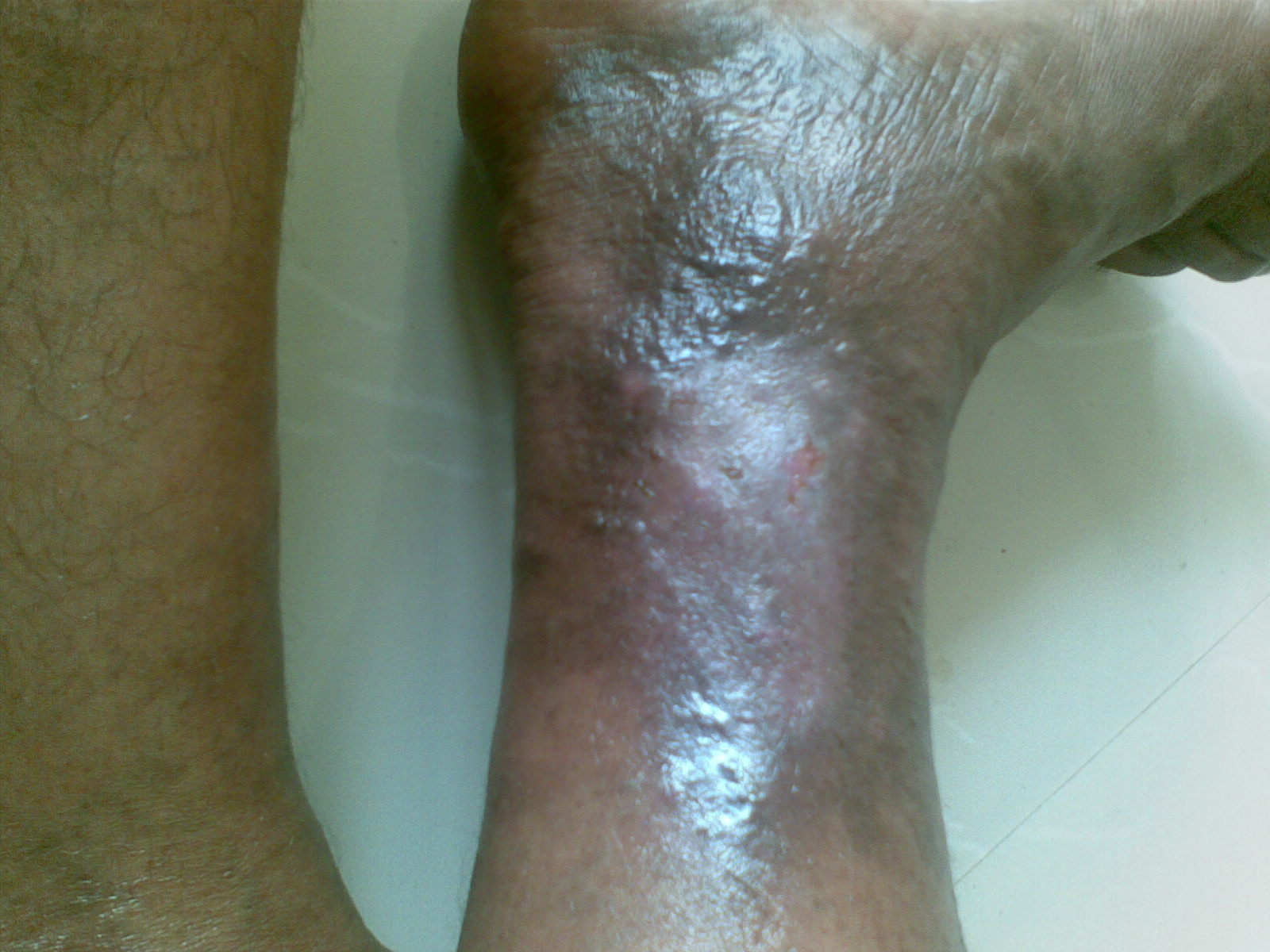
Healing venous ulcer after one month

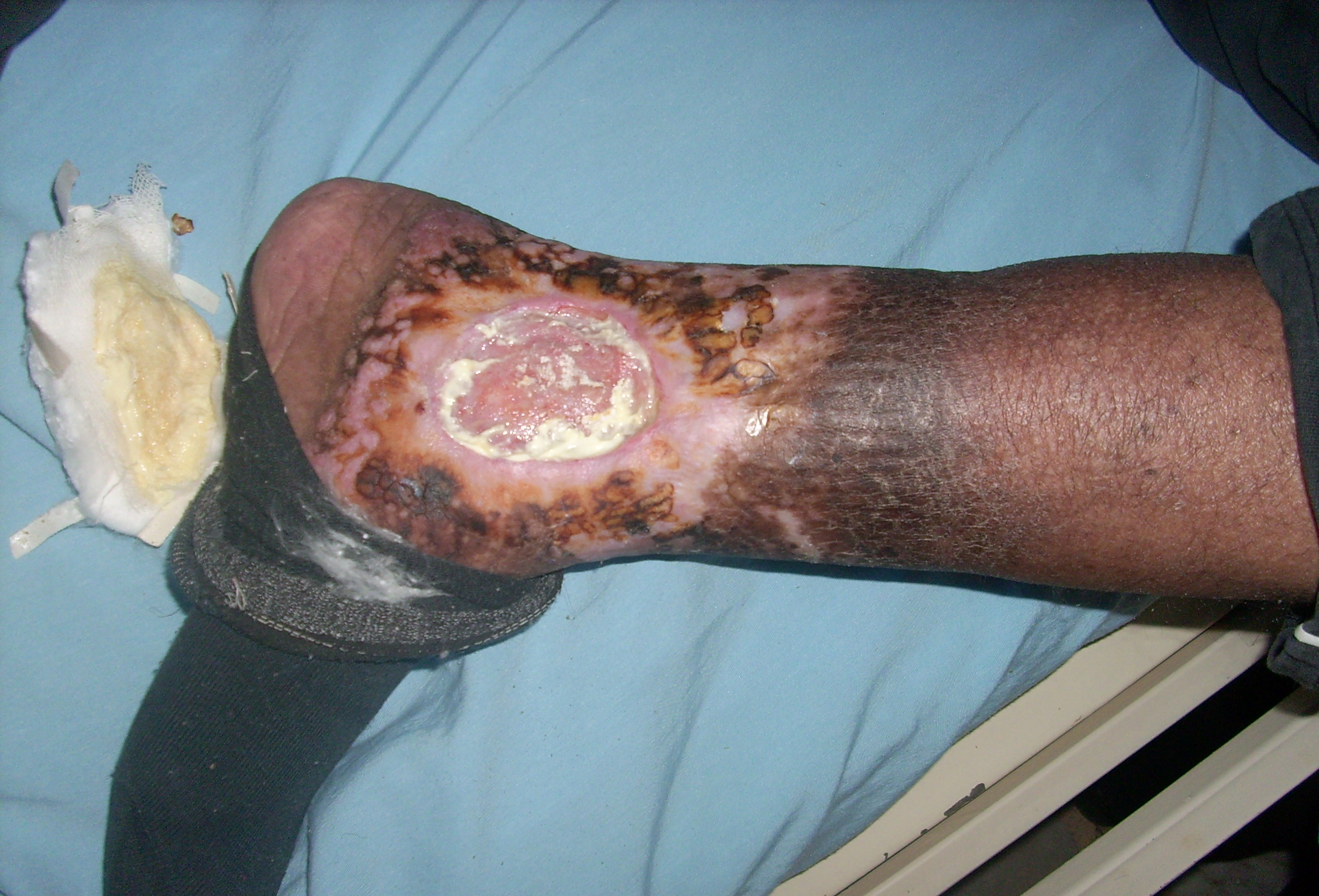
Chronic venous insufficiency & Venous ulcer

== Pathophysiology ==
The exact cause of venous ulcers is not certain. A common denominator is generally venous stasis, which may be caused by chronic venous insufficiency, and/or congestive heart failure. Venous stasis causes the pressure in veins to increase. The body needs the pressure gradient between arteries and veins for the heart to pump blood forward through arteries and into veins. When venous hypertension exists, arteries no longer have significantly higher pressure than veins, and blood is not pumped as effectively into or out of the area.

Venous hypertension may also stretch veins and allow blood proteins to leak into the extravascular space, isolating extracellular matrix (ECM) molecules and growth factors, preventing them from helping to heal the wound. Leakage of fibrinogen from veins as well as deficiencies in fibrinolysis may also cause fibrin to build up around the vessels, preventing oxygen and nutrients from reaching cells. Venous insufficiency may also cause white blood cells (leukocytes) to accumulate in small blood vessels, releasing inflammatory factors and reactive oxygen species (ROS, free radicals) and further contributing to chronic wound formation. Buildup of white blood cells in small blood vessels may also plug the vessels, further contributing to ischemia. This blockage of blood vessels by leukocytes may be responsible for the "no reflow phenomenon", in which ischemic tissue is never fully reperfused. Allowing blood to flow back into the limb, for example by elevating it, is necessary but also contributes to reperfusion injury. Other comorbidities may also be the root cause of venous ulcers.

It is in the crus that the classic venous stasis ulcer occurs. Venous stasis results from damage to the venous valvular system in the lower extremity and, in extreme cases, allows the pressure in the veins to be higher than the pressure in the arteries. This pressure results in transudation of inflammatory mediators into the subcutaneous tissues of the lower extremity and subsequent breakdown of the tissue, including the skin.

Wounds of the distal lower extremities arising from causes not directly related to venous insufficiency (e.g., scratch, bite, burn, or surgical incision) may ultimately fail to heal if underlying (often undiagnosed) venous disease is not properly addressed.

== Diagnosis ==
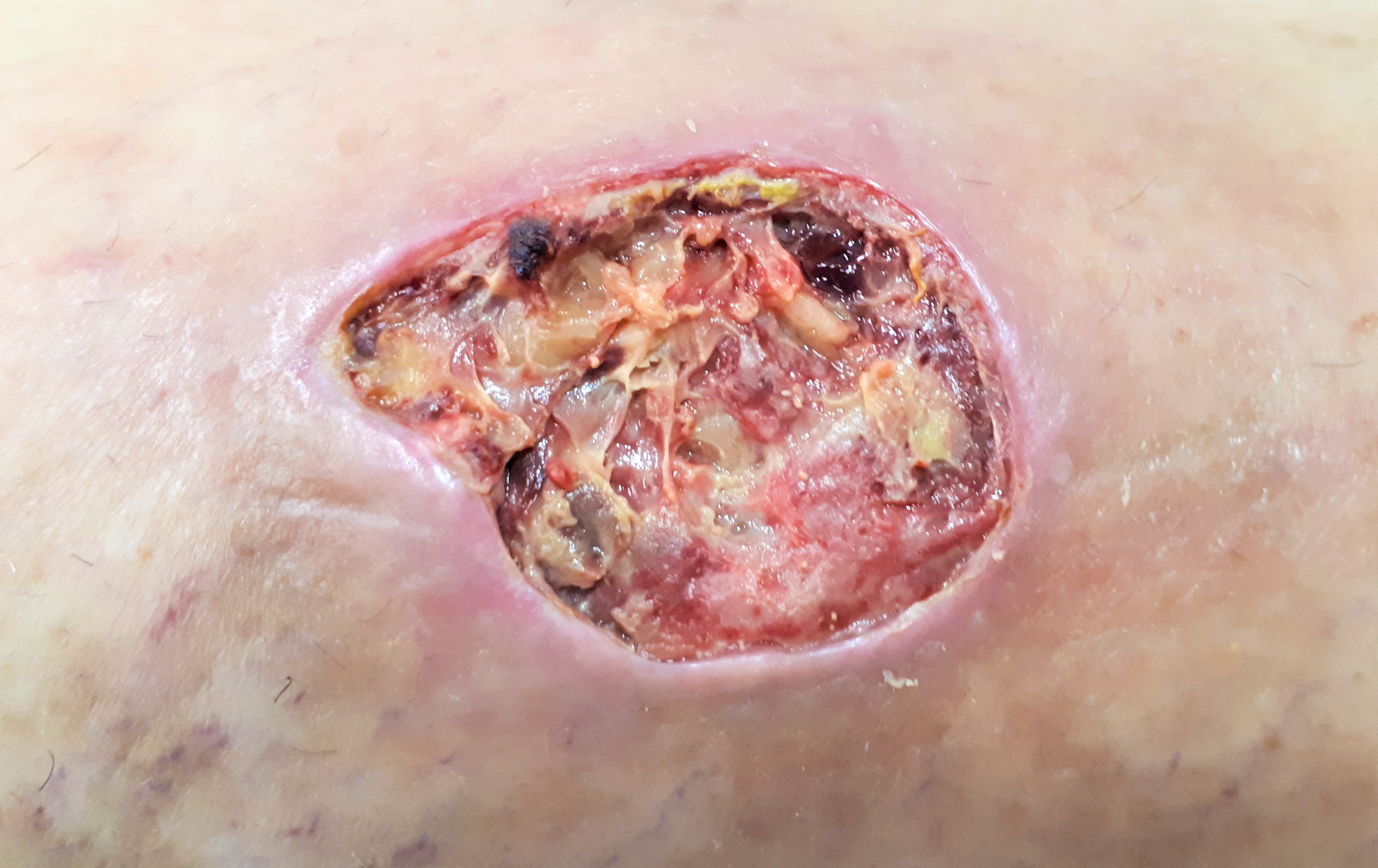
Venous ulcer (45 x 30 mm)

=== Classification ===
A clinical severity score has been developed to assess chronic venous ulcers. It is based on the CEAP (clinical, etiology, anatomy, and pathophysiology) classification system developed by an expert panel. A high score gives a poor prognosis.

=== Distinction from arterial ulcer ===
A venous ulcer tends to occur on the medial side of the leg, typically around the medial malleolus in the 'gaiter area', whereas arterial ulcer tends to occur on the lateral side of the leg and over bony prominences. A venous ulcer is typically shallow with irregular sloping edges, whereas an arterial ulcer can be deep and has a 'punched out' appearance. Venous ulcers are typically 'wet' with a moderate to heavy exudate, whereas arterial ulcers are typically 'dry' and scabbed. The skin surrounding a venous ulcer may be edematous (swollen), and there may be evidence of varicose veins; the skin surrounding an arterial ulcer may be pale, cold, shiny and hairless. Both venous and arterial ulcers may be painful; however, arterial ulcers tend to be more painful, especially with elevation of the leg, for example, when in bed.

=== Differential diagnosis ===
Leg ulcerations may result from various pathologic processes. Common causes of leg ulcerations include inadequate blood flow and oxygen delivery to tissues as seen in peripheral arterial disease and venous stasis ulcerations. Additional causes include neutrophilic skin conditions such as pyoderma gangrenosum or Sweet's syndrome; vasculitic processes such as cryoglobulinemia; calciphylaxis (often seen in people with end-stage kidney disease but may also occur with medications such as warfarin); cancers such as squamous cell carcinoma (Marjolin's ulcer) or myelodysplastic syndrome; neuropathy (e.g., diabetic peripheral neuropathy); or atypical infections such as nocardiosis, sporotrichosis, or mycobacterial infections.

== Prevention ==
Compression stockings appear to prevent the formation of new ulcers in people with a history of venous ulcers.

== Treatment ==
The treatment aims to create an environment that allows skin to grow across an ulcer. In most cases, this requires finding and treating underlying venous reflux. The National Institute for Health and Care Excellence (NICE) recommends referral to a vascular service for anyone with a leg ulcer that has not healed within two weeks or anyone with a healed leg ulcer.

Most venous ulcers respond to patient education, elevation of the foot, elastic compression, and evaluation (known as the Bisgaard regimen). Exercise together with compression stocking increases healing. There is no evidence that antibiotics, whether administered intravenously or by mouth, are useful. Silver products are also not typically useful, while there is some evidence of benefit from cadexomer iodine creams. There is a lack of quality evidence regarding the use of medical-grade honey for venous leg ulcers.

The recommendations for dressings to treat venous ulcers vary between the countries. Antibiotics are often recommended to be used only if advised by the physician due to the emergence of bacterial resistance to antibiotics. This is an issue with venous ulcers as they tend to heal more slowly than acute wounds, for example. Natural alternatives that are suitable for long-term use exist on the market, such as honey and resin salve. These products are considered as Medical Devices in EU and the products have to be CE marked.

Sugar has long been known for its effectiveness in wound treatment, notably through the use of honey or powdered sugar. Several articles demonstrate the efficacy of sugar application in the treatment of ulcers of diabetic origin, as well as necrotic wounds. A study of 50 leg ulcer patients demonstrated the efficacy of a weekly treatment consisting solely of a 60% / 40% glucose/vaseline mixture applied to the wound, without debridement. Complementary compression therapy is used to reduce the effects of venous insufficiency.

There is uncertain evidence whether alginate dressing is effective in the healing of venous ulcers when compared to hydrocolloid dressing or plain non-adherent dressing.

It is uncertain whether therapeutic ultrasound improves the healing of venous ulcers.

=== Compression therapy ===
Non-elastic, ambulatory, below-knee (BK) compression counters the impact of reflux on venous pump failure. Compression therapy is used for venous leg ulcers and can decrease blood vessel diameter and pressure, which increases their effectiveness, preventing blood from flowing backwards. Compression is also used to decrease release of inflammatory cytokines, lower the amount of fluid leaking from capillaries and therefore prevent swelling, and prevent clotting by decreasing activation of thrombin and increasing that of plasmin. Compression is applied using elastic bandages or boots specifically designed for the purpose.

A 2021 systematic review found that compression dressings probably reduce pain and help ulcers to heal more quickly (usually within 12 months) and may also improve quality of life. However, it is not clear whether or not compression bandages have any unwanted effects or if the potential health benefits of using compression outweigh its costs. It is not clear whether non-elastic systems are better than a multilayer elastic system. Patients should wear as much compression as is comfortable. In treating an existing ulcer, the type of dressing applied beneath the compression does not seem to matter, and hydrocolloid is not better than simple low adherent dressings. Good outcomes in ulcer treatment were shown after the application of double compression stockings, e.g., ulcer stockings. These systems contain two different stockings, one often of white colour. This one is to be put on first, is also worn overnight, and exerts a basic pressure of 20 mmHg or less. Also, it keeps the wound dressing in place. A second stocking, often brown, sometimes black, achieves a pressure of 20–30 mmHg and is applied over the other stocking during the daytime.

Intermittent pneumatic compression devices may be used, but it is not clear that they are superior to simple compression dressings.

It is not clear if interventions that aim to help people adhere to compression therapy are effective. More research is needed in this field.

=== Medications ===
Pentoxifylline is a useful add-on treatment to compression stockings and may also help by itself. It works by reducing platelet aggregation and thrombus formation. Gastrointestinal disturbances were reported as a potential adverse effect.

Sulodexide, which reduces the formation of blood clots and reduces inflammation, may improve the healing of venous ulcers when taken in conjunction with proper local wound care. Further research is necessary to determine potential adverse effects, the effectiveness, and the dosing protocol for sulodexide treatment.

An oral dose of aspirin is being investigated as a potential treatment option for people with venous ulcers. A 2016 Cochrane systematic review concluded that further research is necessary before this treatment option can be confirmed to be safe and effective.

Oral zinc supplements have not been proven to be effective in aiding the healing of venous ulcers; however, more research is necessary to confirm these results.

Treatments aimed at decreasing protease activity to promote healing in chronic wounds have been suggested; however, the benefit remains uncertain. There is also a lack of evidence on the effectiveness of testing for elevated proteases in venous ulcers and treating them with protease-modulating treatment. There is low certainty evidence that protease modulating matrix treatment is helpful in the healing of venous ulcers.

Flavonoids may be useful for treating venous ulcers, but the evidence must be interpreted cautiously.

==== Wound cleansing solutions ====
There is insufficient evidence to determine if cleaning wounds is beneficial or whether wound cleaning solutions (polyhexamethylene biguanide, aqueous oxygen peroxide, etc.) are better than sterile water or saline solutions to help venous leg ulcers heal. It is uncertain whether the choice of cleaning solution or method of application makes any difference to venous leg ulcer healing.

=== Skin grafts and artificial skin ===
Two layers of skin created from animal sources as a skin graft is useful in venous leg ulcers.

Artificial skin, made of collagen and cultured skin cells, is also used to cover venous ulcers and excrete growth factors to help them heal. A systematic review found that bilayer artificial skin with compression bandaging is useful in the healing of venous ulcers when compared to simple dressings.

=== Surgery ===
A randomized controlled trial found that surgery "reduces the recurrence of ulcers at four years and results in a greater proportion of ulcer free time".

Local anaesthetic endovenous surgery using the thermoablation (endovenous laser ablation or radiofrequency), perforator closure (TRLOP) and foam sclerotherapy showed an 85% success rate of healing, with no recurrence of healed ulcers at an average of 3.1 years, and a clinical improvement in 98% in a selected group of venous leg ulcers.

Endovenous ablation, in combination with compression, on superficial venous incompetence has been shown (high-quality evidence) to improve leg ulcer healing when compared to compression alone. The use of subfascial endoscopic perforator surgery is uncertain in the healing of venous ulcers.

=== Dressings ===
It is not certain which dressings and topical agents are most effective for healing venous leg ulcers. Silver-containing dressings may increase the probability of healing for venous leg ulcers.

A 2013 Cochrane systematic review aimed to determine the effectiveness of foam dressings for helping to heal venous leg ulcers. The authors concluded that it is uncertain whether or not foam dressings are more effective than other dressing types and that more randomized controlled trials are needed to help answer this research question. However, there is some evidence that ibuprofen dressings may offer pain relief to people with venous leg ulcers.

== Prognosis ==
Venous ulcers are costly to treat, and there is a significant chance that they will recur after healing; one study found that up to 48% of venous ulcers had recurred by the fifth year after healing. However, treatment with local anaesthetic endovenous techniques suggests a reduction of this high recurrence rate is possible.

Without proper care, the ulcer may get infected, leading to cellulitis or gangrene and eventually may need amputation of the part of the limb in the future.

Some topical drugs used to treat venous ulcer may cause venous eczema.

== Research ==
The current 'best' practice in the UK is to treat the underlying venous reflux once an ulcer has healed. It is questionable whether endovenous treatment should be offered before ulcer healing, as current evidence would not support this approach as standard care. The EVRA (Early Venous Reflux Ablation) ulcer trial, a randomised clinical trial funded by the National Institute for Health and Care Research (NIHR) to compare early versus delayed endovenous treatment of superficial venous reflux in patients with chronic venous ulceration, opened for recruitment in October 2013. The study hopes to show an increase in healing rates from 60% to 75% at 24 weeks.

Research from the University of Surrey and funded by the Leg Ulcer Charity looked at the psychological impact of having a leg ulcer, on the relatives and friends of the affected person, and the influence of treatment.
