= Chronic wound =

Wound that does not heal quickly

A chronic wound is a wound that does not progress through the normal stages of wound healing—hemostasis, inflammation, proliferation, and remodeling—in a predictable and timely manner. Typically, wounds that do not heal within three months are classified as chronic. Chronic wounds may remain in the inflammatory phase due to factors like infection or bacterial burden, ischaemia, presence of necrotic tissue, improper moisture balance of wound site, or underlying diseases such as diabetes mellitus.

In acute wounds, a regulated balance of pro-inflammatory cytokines (signalling molecules) and proteases (enzymes) prevent the degradation of the extracellular matrix (ECM) and collagen to ensure proper wound healing.

In chronic wounds, there is excessive levels of inflammatory cytokines and proteases, leading to excessive degradation of the ECM and collagen. This disrupts tissue repair and impedes recovery, keeping the wound in a non-healing state.

Chronic wounds may take years to heal or, in some cases, may never heal, causing significant physical and emotional stress for patients and placing a financial burden on healthcare systems. Acute and chronic wounds are part of a spectrum, with chronic wounds requiring prolonged and complex care compared to acute wounds.

== Signs and symptoms ==
Chronic wound patients often report pain as dominant in their lives. It is recommended that healthcare providers handle the pain related to chronic wounds as one of the main priorities in chronic wound management (together with addressing the cause). Six out of ten venous leg ulcer patients experience pain with their ulcer, and similar trends are observed for other chronic wounds.

Persistent pain (at night, at rest, and with activity) is the main problem for patients with chronic ulcers. Frustrations regarding ineffective analgesics and plans of care that they were unable to adhere to were also identified.

== Cause ==
In addition to poor circulation, neuropathy, and difficulty moving, factors that contribute to chronic wounds include systemic illnesses, age, and repeated trauma. The genetic skin disorders collectively known as epidermolysis bullosa display skin fragility and a tendency to develop chronic, non-healing wounds. Comorbid ailments that may contribute to the formation of chronic wounds include vasculitis (an inflammation of blood vessels), immune suppression, pyoderma gangrenosum, and diseases that cause ischemia. Immune suppression can be caused by illnesses or medical drugs used over a long period, like steroids. Emotional stress can also negatively affect the healing of a wound, possibly by raising blood pressure and levels of cortisol, which lowers immunity.

What appears to be a chronic wound may also be a malignancy; for example, cancerous tissue can grow until blood cannot reach the cells and the tissue becomes an ulcer. Cancer, especially squamous cell carcinoma, may also form as the result of chronic wounds, probably due to repetitive tissue damage that stimulates rapid cell proliferation.

Another factor that may contribute to chronic wounds is old age. The skin of older people is more easily damaged, and older cells do not proliferate as fast and may not have an adequate response to stress in terms of gene upregulation of stress-related proteins. In older cells, stress response genes are overexpressed when the cell is not stressed, but when it is, the expression of these proteins is not upregulated by as much as in younger cells.

Comorbid factors that can lead to ischemia are especially likely to contribute to chronic wounds. Such factors include chronic fibrosis, edema, sickle cell disease, and peripheral artery disease such as by atherosclerosis.

Repeated physical trauma plays a role in chronic wound formation by continually initiating the inflammatory cascade. The trauma may occur by accident, for example when a leg is repeatedly bumped against a wheelchair rest, or it may be due to intentional acts. Heroin users who lose venous access may resort to 'skin popping', or injecting the drug subcutaneously, which is highly damaging to tissue and frequently leads to chronic ulcers. Children who are repeatedly seen for a wound that does not heal are sometimes found to be victims of a parent with Munchausen syndrome by proxy, a disease in which the abuser may repeatedly inflict harm on the child in order to receive attention.

Periwound skin damage caused by excessive amounts of exudate and other bodily fluids can perpetuate the non-healing status of chronic wounds. Maceration, excoriation, dry (fragile) skin, hyperkeratosis, callus and eczema are frequent problems that interfere with the integrity of periwound skin. They can create a gateway for infection as well as cause wound edge deterioration preventing wound closure.

== Pathophysiology ==
Chronic wounds may affect only the epidermis and dermis, or they may affect tissues all the way to the fascia. They may be formed originally by the same things that cause acute ones, such as surgery or accidental trauma, or they may form as the result of systemic infection, vascular, immune, or nerve insufficiency, or comorbidities such as neoplasias or metabolic disorders. The reason a wound becomes chronic is that the body's ability to deal with the damage is overwhelmed by factors such as repeated trauma, continued pressure, ischemia, or illness.

Though much progress has been accomplished in the study of chronic wounds lately, advances in the study of their healing have lagged behind expectations. This is partly because animal studies are difficult because animals do not get chronic wounds, since they usually have loose skin that quickly contracts, and they normally do not get old enough or have contributing diseases such as neuropathy or chronic debilitating illnesses. Nonetheless, current researchers now understand some of the major factors that lead to chronic wounds, among which are ischemia, reperfusion injury, and bacterial colonization.

=== Ischemia ===
Ischemia is an important factor in the formation and persistence of wounds, especially when it occurs repetitively (as it usually does) or when combined with a patient's old age. Ischemia causes tissue to become inflamed and cells to release factors that attract neutrophils such as interleukins, chemokines, leukotrienes, and complement factors.

While they fight pathogens, neutrophils also release inflammatory cytokines and enzymes that damage cells. One of their important jobs is to produce Reactive Oxygen Species (ROS) to kill bacteria, for which they use an enzyme called myeloperoxidase. The enzymes and ROS produced by neutrophils and other leukocytes damage cells and prevent cell proliferation and wound closure by damaging DNA, lipids, proteins, the extracellular matrix (ECM), and cytokines that speed healing. Neutrophils remain in chronic wounds for longer than they do in acute wounds, and contribute to the fact that chronic wounds have higher levels of inflammatory cytokines and ROS. Since wound fluid from chronic wounds has an excess of proteases and ROS, the fluid itself can inhibit healing by inhibiting cell growth and breaking down growth factors and proteins in the ECM. This impaired healing response is considered uncoordinated. However, soluble mediators of the immune system (growth factors), cell-based therapies and therapeutic chemicals can propagate coordinated healing.

It has been suggested that the three fundamental factors underlying chronic wound pathogenesis are cellular and systemic changes of aging, repeated bouts of ischemia-reperfusion injury, and bacterial colonization with resulting inflammatory host response.

=== Bacterial colonization ===
Since more oxygen in the wound environment allows white blood cells to produce ROS to kill bacteria, patients with inadequate tissue oxygenation, for example those who developed hypothermia during surgery, are at higher risk for infection. The host's immune response to the presence of bacteria prolongs inflammation, delays healing, and damages tissue. Infection can lead not only to chronic wounds but also to gangrene, loss of the infected limb, and death of the patient. More recently, an interplay between bacterial colonization and increases in reactive oxygen species leading to formation and production of biofilms has been shown to generate chronic wounds.

Like ischemia, bacterial colonization and infection damage tissue by causing a greater number of neutrophils to enter the wound site. In patients with chronic wounds, bacteria with resistances to antibiotics may have time to develop. In addition, patients that carry drug resistant bacterial strains such as methicillin-resistant Staphylococcus aureus (MRSA) have more chronic wounds.

=== Growth factors and proteolytic enzymes ===
Chronic wounds also differ in makeup from acute wounds in that their levels of proteolytic enzymes such as elastase. and matrix metalloproteinases (MMPs) are higher, while their concentrations of growth factors such as Platelet-derived growth factor and Keratinocyte Growth Factor are lower.

Since growth factors (GFs) are imperative in timely wound healing, inadequate GF levels may be an important factor in chronic wound formation. In chronic wounds, the formation and release of growth factors may be prevented, the factors may be sequestered and unable to perform their metabolic roles, or degraded in excess by cellular or bacterial proteases.

Chronic wounds such as diabetic and venous ulcers are also caused by a failure of fibroblasts to produce adequate ECM proteins and by keratinocytes to epithelialize the wound. Fibroblast gene expression is different in chronic wounds than in acute wounds.

Though all wounds require a certain level of elastase and proteases for proper healing, too high a concentration is damaging. Leukocytes in the wound area release elastase, which increases inflammation, destroys tissue, proteoglycans, and collagen, and damages growth factors, fibronectin, and factors that inhibit proteases. The activity of elastase is increased by human serum albumin, which is the most abundant protein found in chronic wounds. However, chronic wounds with inadequate albumin are especially unlikely to heal, so regulating the wound's levels of that protein may in the future prove helpful in healing chronic wounds.

Excess matrix metalloproteinases, which are released by leukocytes, may also cause wounds to become chronic. MMPs break down ECM molecules, growth factors, and protease inhibitors, and thus increase degradation while reducing construction, throwing the delicate compromise between production and degradation out of balance.

== Diagnosis ==
=== Infection ===
If a chronic wound becomes more painful this is a good indication that it is infected. A lack of pain however does not mean that it is not infected. Other methods of determination are less effective.

=== Classification ===
The vast majority of chronic wounds can be classified into three categories: venous ulcers, diabetic, and pressure ulcers. A small number of wounds that do not fall into these categories may be due to causes such as radiation poisoning or ischemia.

==== Venous and arterial ulcers ====
Venous ulcers, which usually occur in the legs, account for about 70% to 90% of chronic wounds and mostly affect the elderly. They are thought to be due to venous hypertension caused by improper function of valves that exist in the veins to prevent blood from flowing backward. Ischemia results from the dysfunction and, combined with reperfusion injury, causes the tissue damage that leads to the wounds.

==== Diabetic ulcers ====
Another major cause of chronic wounds, diabetes, is increasing in prevalence. Diabetics have a 15% higher risk for amputation than the general population due to chronic ulcers. Diabetes causes neuropathy, which inhibits nociception and the perception of pain. Thus patients may not initially notice small wounds to legs and feet, and may therefore fail to prevent infection or repeated injury. Further, diabetes causes immune compromise and damage to small blood vessels, preventing adequate oxygenation of tissue, which can cause chronic wounds. Pressure also plays a role in the formation of diabetic ulcers.

==== Pressure ulcers ====
Another leading type of chronic wounds is pressure ulcers, which usually occur in people with conditions such as paralysis that inhibit movement of body parts that are commonly subjected to pressure such as the heels, shoulder blades, and sacrum. Pressure ulcers are caused by ischemia that occurs when pressure on the tissue is greater than the pressure in capillaries, and thus restricts blood flow into the area. Muscle tissue, which needs more oxygen and nutrients than skin does, shows the worst effects from prolonged pressure. As in other chronic ulcers, reperfusion injury damages tissue.

== Treatment ==
Though treatment of the different chronic wound types varies slightly, appropriate treatment seeks to address the problems at the root of chronic wounds, including ischemia, bacterial load, and imbalance of proteases. Periwound skin issues should be assessed and their abatement included in a proposed treatment plan. Various methods exist to ameliorate these problems, including antibiotic and antibacterial use, debridement, irrigation, vacuum-assisted closure, warming, oxygenation, moist wound healing (the term pioneered by George D. Winter), removing mechanical stress, and adding cells or other materials to secrete or enhance levels of healing factors.

It is uncertain whether intravenous metronidazole is useful in reducing foul smelling from malignant wounds. There is insufficient evidence to use silver-containing dressings or topical agents for the treatment of infected or contaminated chronic wounds. For infected wounds, the following antibiotics are often used (if organisms are susceptible) as oral therapy due to their high bioavailability and good penetration into soft tissues: ciprofloxacin, clindamycin, minocycline, linezolid, moxifloxacin, and trimethoprim-sulfamethoxazole.

The challenge of any treatment is to address as many adverse factors as possible simultaneously, so each of them receives equal attention and does not continue to impede healing as the treatment progresses.

=== Preventing and treating infection ===
To lower the bacterial count in wounds, therapists may use topical antibiotics, which kill bacteria and can also help by keeping the wound environment moist, which is important for speeding the healing of chronic wounds. Some researchers have experimented with the use of tea tree oil, an antibacterial agent which also has anti-inflammatory effects. Disinfectants are contraindicated because they damage tissues and delay wound contraction. Further, they are rendered ineffective by organic matter in wounds like blood and exudate and are thus not useful in open wounds.

A greater amount of exudate and necrotic tissue in a wound increases likelihood of infection by serving as a medium for bacterial growth away from the host's defenses. Since bacteria thrive on dead tissue, wounds are often surgically debrided to remove the devitalized tissue. Debridement and drainage of wound fluid are an especially important part of the treatment for diabetic ulcers, which may create the need for amputation if infection gets out of control. Mechanical removal of bacteria and devitalized tissue is also the idea behind wound irrigation, which is accomplished using pulsed lavage.

Removing necrotic or devitalized tissue is also the aim of maggot therapy, the intentional introduction by a health care practitioner of live, disinfected maggots into non-healing wounds. Maggots dissolve only necrotic, infected tissue; disinfect the wound by killing bacteria; and stimulate wound healing. Maggot therapy has been shown to accelerate debridement of necrotic wounds and reduce the bacterial load of the wound, leading to earlier healing, reduced wound odor and less pain. The combination and interactions of these actions make maggots an extremely potent tool in chronic wound care.

Negative pressure wound therapy (NPWT) is a treatment that improves ischemic tissues and removes wound fluid used by bacteria. This therapy, also known as vacuum-assisted closure, reduces swelling in tissues, which brings more blood and nutrients to the area, as does the negative pressure itself. The treatment also decompresses tissues and alters the shape of cells, causes them to express different mRNAs and to proliferate and produce ECM molecules.

Recent technological advancements produced novel approaches such as self-adaptive wound dressings that rely on properties of smart polymers sensitive to changes in humidity levels. The dressing delivers absorption or hydration as needed over each independent wound area and aids in the natural process of autolytic debridement. It effectively removes liquefied slough and necrotic tissue, disintegrated bacterial biofilm as well as harmful exudate components, known to slow the healing process. The treatment also reduces bacterial load by effective evacuation and immobilization of microorganisms from the wound bed, and subsequent chemical binding of available water that is necessary for their replication. Self-adaptive dressings protect periwound skin from extrinsic factors and infection while regulating moisture balance over vulnerable skin around the wound.

=== Treating trauma and painful wounds ===
Persistent chronic pain associated with non-healing wounds is caused by tissue (nociceptive) or nerve (neuropathic) damage and is influenced by dressing changes and chronic inflammation. Chronic wounds take a long time to heal and patients can experience chronic wounds for many years. Chronic wound healing may be compromised by coexisting underlying conditions, such as venous valve backflow, peripheral vascular disease, uncontrolled edema and diabetes mellitus.

If wound pain is not assessed and documented it may be ignored and/or not addressed properly. It is important to remember that increased wound pain may be an indicator of wound complications that need treatment, and therefore practitioners must constantly reassess the wound as well as the associated pain.

Optimal management of wounds requires holistic assessment. Documentation of the patient's pain experience is critical and may range from the use of a patient diary, (which should be patient driven), to recording pain entirely by the healthcare professional or caregiver. Effective communication between the patient and the healthcare team is fundamental to this holistic approach. The more frequently healthcare professionals measure pain, the greater the likelihood of introducing or changing pain management practices.

At present there are few local options for the treatment of persistent pain, whilst managing the exudate levels present in many chronic wounds. Important properties of such local options are that they provide an optimal wound healing environment, while providing a constant local low dose release of ibuprofen while worn.

If local treatment does not provide adequate pain reduction, it may be necessary for patients with chronic painful wounds to be prescribed additional systemic treatment for the physical component of their pain. Clinicians should consult with their prescribing colleagues referring to the WHO pain relief ladder of systemic treatment options for guidance. For every pharmacological intervention there are possible benefits and adverse events that the prescribing clinician will need to consider in conjunction with the wound care treatment team.

=== Ischemia and hypoxia ===
Blood vessels constrict in tissue that becomes cold and dilate in warm tissue, altering blood flow to the area. Thus keeping the tissues warm is probably necessary to fight both infection and ischemia. Some healthcare professionals use 'radiant bandages' to keep the area warm, and care must be taken during surgery to prevent hypothermia, which increases rates of post-surgical infection.

Underlying ischemia may also be treated surgically by arterial revascularization, for example in diabetic ulcers, and patients with venous ulcers may undergo surgery to correct vein dysfunction.

Diabetics that are not candidates for surgery (and others) may also have their tissue oxygenation increased by Hyperbaric Oxygen Therapy, or HBOT, which may provide a short-term improvement in healing by improving the oxygenated blood supply to the wound. In addition to killing bacteria, higher oxygen content in tissues speeds growth factor production, fibroblast growth, and angiogenesis. However, increased oxygen levels also means increased production of ROS. Antioxidants, molecules that can lose an electron to free radicals without themselves becoming radicals, can lower levels of oxidants in the body and have been used with some success in wound healing.

Low level laser therapy has been repeatedly shown to significantly reduce the size and severity of diabetic ulcers as well as other pressure ulcers.

Pressure wounds are often the result of local ischemia from the increased pressure. Increased pressure also plays a roles in many diabetic foot ulcerations as changes due to the disease causes the foot to have limited joint mobility and creates pressure points on the bottom of the foot. Effective measures to treat this includes a surgical procedure called the gastrocnemius recession in which the calf muscle is lengthened to decrease the fulcrum created by this muscle and resulting in a decrease in plantar forefoot pressure.

=== Growth factors and hormones ===
Since chronic wounds underexpress growth factors necessary for healing tissue, chronic wound healing may be speeded by replacing or stimulating those factors and by preventing the excessive formation of proteases like elastase that break them down.

One way to increase growth factor concentrations in wounds is to apply the growth factors directly. This generally takes many repetitions and requires large amounts of the factors, although biomaterials are being developed that control the delivery of growth factors over time. Another way is to spread onto the wound a gel of the patient's own blood platelets, which then secrete growth factors such as vascular endothelial growth factor (VEGF), insulin-like growth factor 1–2 (IGF), PDGF, transforming growth factor-β (TGF-β), and epidermal growth factor (EGF). Other treatments include implanting cultured keratinocytes into the wound to reepithelialize it and culturing and implanting fibroblasts into wounds. Some patients are treated with artificial skin substitutes that have fibroblasts and keratinocytes in a matrix of collagen to replicate skin and release growth factors.

In other cases, skin from cadavers is grafted onto wounds, providing a cover to keep out bacteria and preventing the buildup of too much granulation tissue, which can lead to excessive scarring. Though the allograft (skin transplanted from a member of the same species) is replaced by granulation tissue and is not actually incorporated into the healing wound, it encourages cellular proliferation and provides a structure for epithelial cells to crawl across. On the most difficult chronic wounds, allografts may not work, requiring skin grafts from elsewhere on the patient, which can cause pain and further stress on the patient's system.

Collagen dressings are another way to provide the matrix for cellular proliferation and migration, while also keeping the wound moist and absorbing exudate. Additionally Collagen has been shown to be chemotactic to human blood monocytes, which can enter the wound site and transform into beneficial wound-healing cells.

Since levels of protease inhibitors are lowered in chronic wounds, some researchers are seeking ways to heal tissues by replacing these inhibitors in them. Secretory leukocyte protease inhibitor (SLPI), which inhibits not only proteases but also inflammation and microorganisms like viruses, bacteria, and fungi, may prove to be an effective treatment.

Research into hormones and wound healing has shown estrogen to speed wound healing in elderly humans and in animals that have had their ovaries removed, possibly by preventing excess neutrophils from entering the wound and releasing elastase. Thus the use of estrogen is a future possibility for treating chronic wounds.

== Epidemiology ==
Chronic wounds mostly affect people over the age of 60. The incidence is 0.78% of the population and the prevalence ranges from 0.18 to 0.32%. As the population ages, the number of chronic wounds is expected to rise. Ulcers that heal within 12 weeks are usually classified as acute, and longer-lasting ones as chronic.
