= Artificial skin =

Material to regenerate or replace skin

Artificial skin is a collagen scaffold that induces regeneration of skin in mammals such as humans. The term was used in the late 1970s and early 1980s to describe a new treatment for massive burns. It was later discovered that treatment of deep skin wounds in adult animals and humans with this scaffold induces regeneration of the dermis. It has been developed commercially under the name Integra and is used in massively burned patients, during plastic surgery of the skin, and in treatment of chronic skin wounds.

Alternatively, the term "artificial skin" sometimes is used to refer to skin-like tissue grown in a laboratory, although this technology is still quite a way away from being viable for use in the medical field. 'Artificial skin' can also refer to flexible semiconductor materials that can sense touch for those with prosthetic limbs (also experimental).

== Background ==
The skin is the largest organ in the human body. Skin is made up of three layers, the epidermis, dermis and the fat layer, also called the hypodermis. The epidermis is the outer layer of skin that keeps vital fluids in and harmful bacteria out of the body. The dermis is the inner layer of skin that contains blood vessels, nerves, hair follicles, oil, and sweat glands.

Traditional ways of dealing with large losses of skin have been to use skin grafts from the patient (autografts) or from an unrelated donor or a cadaver. The former approach has the disadvantage that there may not be enough skin available, while the latter suffers from the possibility of rejection or infection. Until the late 20th century, skin grafts were constructed from the patient's own skin. This became a problem when skin had been damaged extensively, making it impossible to treat severely injured patients with autografts only.

== Regenerated skin: discovery and clinical use ==
A process for inducing regeneration in skin was invented by Ioannis V. Yannas (then an assistant professor in the Fibers and Polymers Division, Department of Mechanical Engineering, at Massachusetts Institute of Technology) and John F. Burke (then chief of staff at Shriners Burns Institute in Boston, Massachusetts). Their initial objective was to discover a wound cover that would protect severe skin wounds from infection by accelerating wound closure. Several kinds of grafts made of synthetic and natural polymers were prepared and tested in a guinea pig animal model. By the late 1970s it was evident that the original objective was not reached. Instead, these experimental grafts typically did not affect the speed of wound closure. In one case, however, a particular type of collagen graft led to significant delay of wound closure. Careful study of histology samples revealed that grafts that delayed wound closure induced the synthesis of new dermis de novo at the injury site, instead of forming scar, which is the normal outcome of the spontaneous wound healing response. This was the first demonstration of regeneration of a tissue (dermis) that does not regenerate by itself in the adult mammal. After the initial discovery, further research led to the composition and fabrication of grafts that were evaluated in clinical trials. These grafts were synthesized as a graft copolymer of microfibrillar type I collagen and a glycosaminoglycan, chondroitin-6-sulfate, fabricated into porous sheets by freeze-drying, and then cross-linked by dehydrothermal treatment. Control of the structural features of the collagen scaffold (average pore size, degradation rate and surface chemistry) was eventually found to be a critical prerequisite for its unusual biological activity. In 1981 Burke and Yannas proved that their artificial skin worked on patients with 50 to 90 percent burns, vastly improving the chances of recovery and improved quality of life. John F. Burke also claimed, in 1981, "[The Artificial skin] is soft and pliable, not stiff and hard, unlike other substances used to cover burned-off skin."

Several patents were granted to MIT for the creation of collagen-based grafts that can induce dermis regeneration. U.S. Patent 4,418,691 (December 6, 1983) was cited by the National Inventors Hall of Fame as the key patent describing the invention of a process for regenerated skin (Inductees Natl. Inventors Hall of Fame, 2015). These patents were later translated into a commercial product by Integra LifeSciences Corp., a company founded in 1989. Integra Dermal Regeneration Template received FDA approval in 1996, and the FDA listed it as a "Significant Medical Device Breakthrough" in the same year. Since then, it has been applied worldwide to treat patients who are in need of new skin to treat massive burns and traumatic skin wounds, those undergoing plastic surgery of the skin, as well as others who have certain forms of skin cancer.

In clinical practice, a thin graft sheet manufactured from the active collagen scaffold is placed on the injury site, which is then covered with a thin sheet of silicone elastomer that protects the wound site from bacterial infection and dehydration. The graft can be seeded with autologous cells (keratinocytes) in order to accelerate wound closure, however the presence of these cells is not required for regenerating the dermis. Grafting skin wounds with Integra leads to the synthesis of normal vascularized and innervated dermis de novo, followed by re-epithelization and formation of epidermis. Although early versions of the scaffold were not capable of regenerating hair follicles and sweat glands, later developments by S.T Boyce and coworkers led to solution of this problem.

The mechanism of regeneration using an active collagen scaffold has been largely clarified. The scaffold retains regenerative activity provided that it has been prepared with appropriate levels of the specific surface (pore size in range 20-125 μm), degradation rate (degradation half-life 14 ± 7 days) and surface chemical features (ligand densities for integrins α1β1 and α2β1 must exceed approximately 200 μΜ α1β1 and α2β1 ligands). It has been hypothesized that specific binding of a sufficient number of contractile cells (myofibroblasts) on the scaffold surface, occurring within a narrow time window, is required for induction of skin regeneration in the presence of this scaffold. Studies with skin wounds have been extended to transected peripheral nerves, and the combined evidence supports a common regeneration mechanism for skin and peripheral nerves using this scaffold.

== Design considerations ==
Fabricating artificial skin has the difficulty of mimicking living tissue with similar biological and mechanical performance. As outlined by Integra founders Yannas and Burke, there are three key factors to consider in the creation of artificial skin: material, bio/physiochemical properties, and mechanical properties.

=== Material ===
Material selection is the most important part for designing artificial skin. It needs to be biocompatible with the body while having adequate properties for adequate function. Human skin is made of type I collagen, elastin, and glycosaminoglycan. The artificial skin by Integra is made of a copolymer composed of collagen and glycosaminoglycan. Collagen is a hydrophilic polymer whose degradation and stiffness can be controlled by the degree of cross linking. However, it can be brittle and susceptible to breakdown by the enzyme collagenase. In order to make the material tougher and more resistant, a copolymer is formed with glycosaminoglycan (GAG). GAGs are long polysaccharides that act as shock absorbers. Collagen-GAG (CG) matrices have a higher modulus of elasticity and energy needed to fracture than collagen alone, making it a more ideal material. An outer layer of silicone is normally applied to the matrix in order to serve as a protective layer. Another material that can be used in synthetic skin is elastin. Elastin has a similar effect to GAG as it reduces the tensile strength and compressive modulus of the material while increasing its toughness.

=== Mechanical properties ===
Not only does the material have to be biocompatible and conducive to proliferation, it also has to have mechanical properties similar to that of real skin in order to serve as an adequate substitute. Skin is the first line of defense for the body, so it is subject to lots of chemical and mechanical assaults. As such, the artificial skin needs to be strong and tear resistant from stretching that occurs in everyday activity. It also needs to be strong enough to resist sutures from surgery. Stiffness can be controlled in several ways. As previously mentioned, crosslinking through chemical or biophysical methods. Chemical methods produce stronger materials, but biophysical methods are more conducive to cell proliferation. Furthermore, it has been noted that skin is viscoelastic and undergoes hysteresis- it has a time dependent stress relaxation factor and goes through a separate path during unloading.

Another important consideration is the wettability of the material. This is the ability of a liquid to maintain contact with a solid surface. If the CG matrix membrane does not wet the woundbed substrate properly, air pockets can form which will lead to infection. The membrane must not be too stiff so it can drape over the surface. Furthermore, shear (lateral) or peeling (normal) forces can displace the membrane such that air pockets can reform. This can be mitigated by adding an adhesive bond like eschar or scab between the two surfaces. Although the mechanical properties of the synthetic skin do not need to be exactly the same as human, the main ones that should be similar include modulus of elasticity, tear strength, and fracture energy.

=== Biophysical and physiochemical properties ===
Ultimately, the goal of the synthetic skin is to close the wound and regrow new skin. This means it first adheres to the wound and creates an airtight seal where neodermal growth can occur. During this time, the synthetic skin must degrade such that there is space for the newly grown skin. Thus, biocompatibility and degradability are also under consideration for design.

== Further research ==
Research is continually being done on artificial skin. Newer technologies, such as an autologous spray-on skin produced by Avita Medical, are being tested in efforts to accelerate healing and minimize scarring.

The Fraunhofer Institute for Interfacial Engineering and Biotechnology is working towards a fully automated process for producing artificial skin. Their goal is a simple two-layer skin without blood vessels that can be used to study how skin interacts with consumer products, such as creams and medicines. They hope to eventually produce more complex skin that can be used in transplants.

Hanna Wendt, and a team of her colleagues in the Department of Plastic, Hand and Reconstructive Surgery at Medical School Hannover Germany, have found a method for creating artificial skin using spider silk. Before this, however, artificial skin was grown using materials like collagen. These materials did not seem strong enough. Instead, Wendt and her team turned to spider silk, which is known to be 5 times stronger than Kevlar. The silk is harvested by "milking" the silk glands of golden orb web spiders. The silk was spooled as it was harvested, and then it was woven into a rectangular steel frame. The steel frame was 0.7 mm thick, and the resulting weave was easy to handle or sterilize. Human skin cells were added to the meshwork silk and were found to flourish under an environment providing nutrients, warmth and air. However at this time, using spider silk to grow artificial skin in mass quantities is not practical because of the tedious process of harvesting spider silk.

Australian researchers are currently searching for a new, innovative way to produce artificial skin. This would produce artificial skin more quickly and in a more efficient way. The skin produced would only be 1 millimeter thick and would only be used to rebuild the epidermis. They can also make the skin 1.5 millimetres thick, which would allow the dermis to repair itself if needed. This would require bone marrow from a donation or from the patient's body. The bone marrow would be used as a "seed", and would be placed in the grafts to mimic the dermis. This has been tested on animals and has been proven to work with animal skin. Professor Maitz said, "In Australia, someone with a full-thickness burn to up to 80 per cent of their body surface area has every prospect of surviving the injury... However their quality of life remains questionable as we're unable, at present, to replace the burned skin with normal skin...We're committed to ensuring the pain of survival is worth it, by developing a living skin equivalent."

== Synthetic skin ==
Another form of "artificial skin" has been created out of flexible semiconductor materials that can sense touch for those with prosthetic limbs. The artificial skin is anticipated to augment robotics in conducting rudimentary jobs that would be considered delicate and require sensitive "touch". Scientists found that by applying a layer of rubber with two parallel electrodes that stored electrical charges inside of the artificial skin, tiny amounts of pressure could be detected. When pressure is exerted, the electrical charge in the rubber is changed and the change is detected by the electrodes.

However, the film is so small that when pressure is applied to the skin, the molecules have nowhere to move and become entangled. The molecules also fail to return to their original shape when the pressure is removed. A recent development in the synthetic skin technique has been made by imparting the color changing properties to the thin layer of silicon with the help of artificial ridges which reflect a very specific wavelength of light. By tuning the spaces between these ridges, color to be reflected by the skin can be controlled. This technology can be used in color-shifting camouflages and sensors that can detect otherwise imperceptible defects in buildings, bridges, and aircraft.
