= Diabetic sock =

Medical garment

A diabetic sock is a non-restrictive, but close fitting garment designed to alleviate internal pressures on the foot or leg. Typically sufferers of diabetes are the most common users of this type of sock, as they have a greater chance of developing peripheral neuropathy, vascular disease, and infections (especially in the legs). Socks and footwear that reduce pressure points and hot spots are therefore important aids to maintaining good health. Diabetes raises the blood sugar level, which can increase the risk of foot ulcers. The socks are made to be non-restrictive to circulation, but if inclusive of a medical grade, FDA-approved compression gradient, they can improve venous return and enhance overall circulation.

Proper diabetic socks also help to manage odor created by excess perspiration, a feature which can reduce the risk of infection. Another beneficial feature is seamless toe closures to avoid any localized pressure or friction, potential hot spots and blistering.

== Varieties ==
Various sock constructions are available, including cotton blends with stretch tops, non-cotton with antimicrobial properties, graduated compression types and plain "non-binding" to allow circulation to flow more freely. Extra wide socks are available for sufferers of excessive edema. Care should be taken with styles listed as "non-binding," as they should not be so loose as to bunch or wrinkle against the skin, which can cause hot spots. The ideal sock for diabetics will be treated in the fabric fibers with an antimicrobial that lasts the life of the garment.

Diabetic socks may appear like regular socks, and are available in many leg lengths. Although various colors are available, white may be preferable for people with open wounds or sores, as this could alert wearers with compromised sensation to a draining wound. The diabetic socks should fit well, without constricting cuffs, lumps, or uncomfortable seams. The advice of a podiatrist may be helpful in choosing a diabetic sock.

== See also ==
- Compression stockings
- Diabetic foot
- Diabetic shoe
