= Pravibismane =

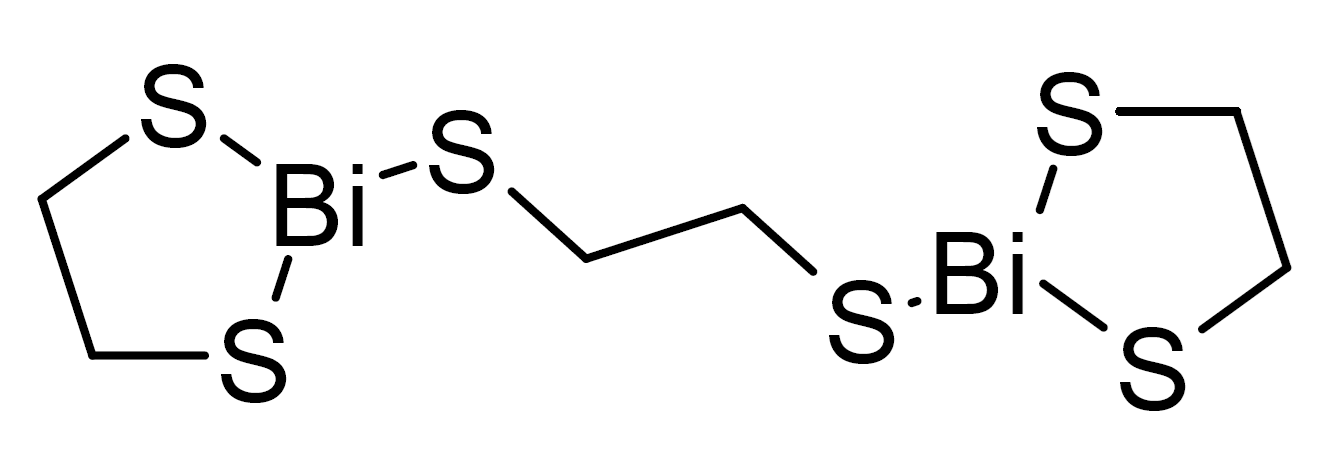

Clinical data
- Other names: BisEDT

Identifiers
- IUPAC name: 2-[2-(1,3,2-dithiabismolan-2-ylsulfanyl)ethylsulfanyl]-1,3,2-dithiabismolane
- CAS Number: 175880-68-9
- PubChem CID: 10327332
- DrugBank: DB17784
- ChemSpider: 52084471
- UNII: G3T79NDD38

Chemical and physical data
- Formula: C_{6}H_{12}Bi_{2}S_{6}
- Molar mass: 694.48 g·mol^{−1}
- 3D model (JSmol): Interactive image
- SMILES: C1CS[Bi](S1)SCCS[Bi]2SCCS2
- InChI: InChI=1S/3C2H6S2.2Bi/c3*3-1-2-4;;/h3*3-4H,1-2H2;;/q;;;2*+3/p-6; Key:GUTNLKRPYCTIHX-UHFFFAOYSA-H

Pravibismane (BisEDT) is an experimental antibiotic medication for topical use. It is in clinical trials for infections secondary to diabetic foot ulcer.
