= Diabetic shoe =

Shoes intended to reduce the risk of skin breakdown in diabetics

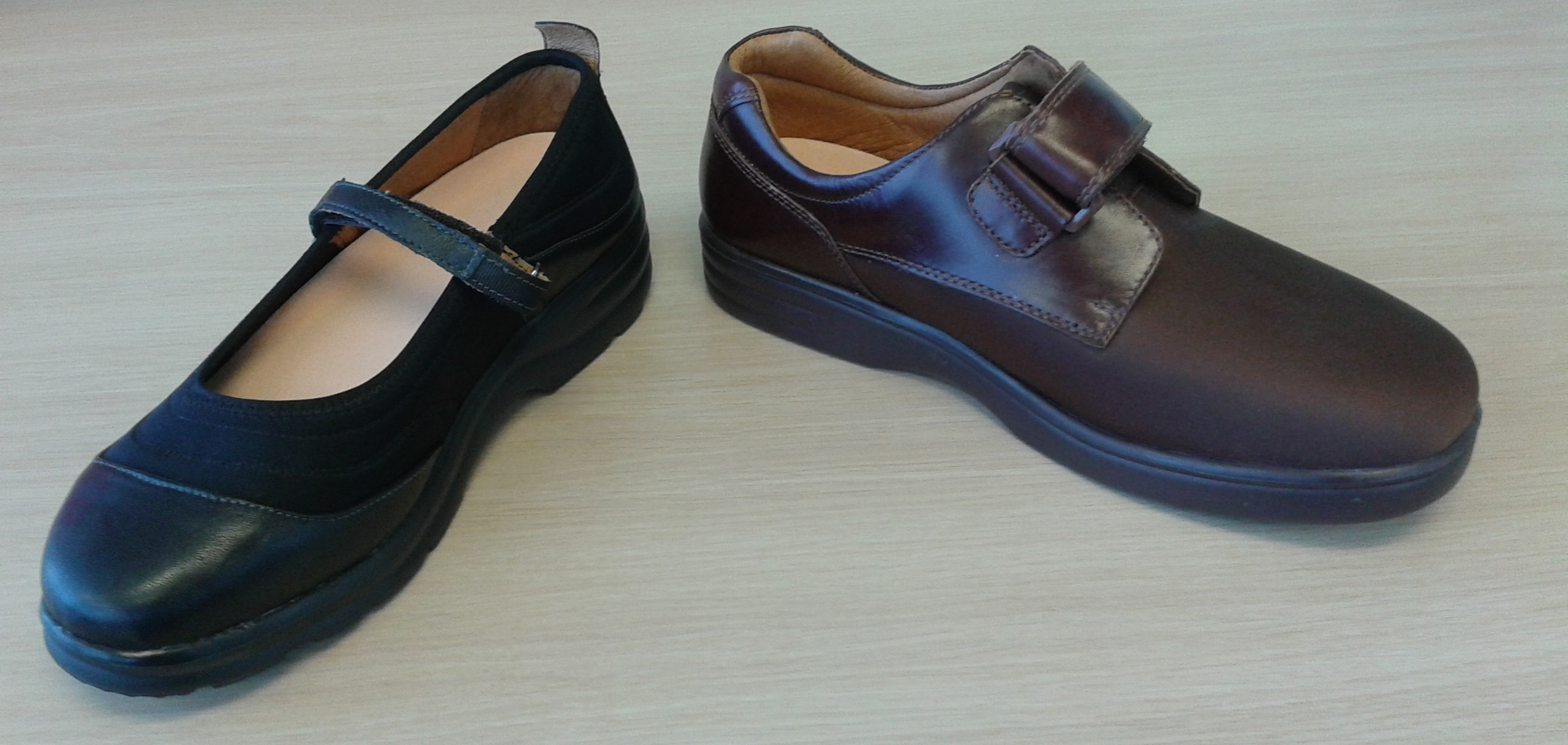
Many diabetic shoes have velcro closures for ease of application and removal.

Diabetic shoes (sometimes referred to as extra depth, therapeutic shoes or sugar shoes) are specially designed shoes, or shoe inserts, intended to reduce the risk of skin breakdown in diabetics with existing foot disease and relieve pressure to prevent diabetic foot ulcers.

People with diabetic neuropathy in their feet may have a false sense of security as to how much at risk their feet actually are. An ulcer under the foot can develop in a couple of hours. The primary goal of therapeutic footwear is to prevent complications, which can include strain, ulcers, calluses, or even amputations for patients with diabetes and poor circulation. Neuropathy can also change the shape of a person's feet, which limits the range of shoes that can be worn comfortably. In addition to meeting strict guidelines, diabetic shoes must be prescribed by a physician and fit by a certified individual, such as an orthotist, podiatrist, therapeutic shoe fitter, or pedorthist. The shoes must also be equipped with a removable orthosis. Foot orthoses are devices such as shoe inserts, arch supports, or shoe fillers such as lifts, wedges and heels. The diabetic shoes and custom-molded inserts work together as a preventive system to help diabetics avoid foot injuries and improve mobility.

The evidence for special footwear to treat diabetic foot ulcers is poor, but their effectiveness for prevention is well-established. Design features of footwear that are effective in reducing pressure are arch supports, cushioned cut-outs around points at risk of damage, and cushioning at the ball of the foot. Technology for measuring the pressure within the shoes is recommended during designing diabetic footwear.

In the United States, diabetic shoes can be covered by Medicare.

== See also ==
- List of shoe styles
- Diabetic sock
- Diabetic foot
