= Microbial synergy =

Microbial synergy is a phenomenon in which aerobic and anaerobic microbes support each other's growth and proliferation. In this process aerobes invade and destroy host tissues, reduce tissue oxygen concentration and redox potential, thus creating favorable conditions for anaerobic growth and proliferation. Anaerobes grow and produce short chain fatty acids such as butyric acid, propionic acid. These short chain fatty acids inhibit phagocytosis of aerobes. Thus aerobes grow, proliferate and destroy more tissues. Microbial synergy complicates and delays the healing of surgical and other chronic wounds or ulcers such as diabetic foot ulcers, venous ulcers, pressure ulcers etc. Microbial synergy also helps with eliminating oxygen redox. This allows the growth of organisms without the effects of oxygen reacting negatively. As a result, Microbial growth increases because other organisms can grow in the absence of Oxygen redox.
