= Integra LifeSciences =

Device manufacturing company

Integra LifeSciences Holdings Corporation
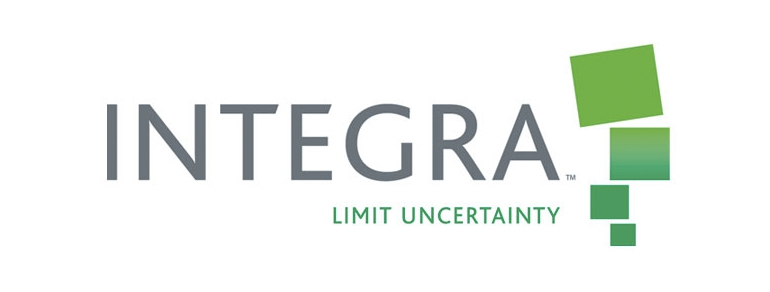
- Trade name: IART
- Type: Public
- Traded as: Nasdaq: IART; S&P 600 component
- Industry: Medical technology
- Founded: 1989; 37 years ago
- Headquarters: Princeton, New Jersey, U.S.
- Key people: Stuart Essig (CEO)
- Products: Regenerative technology; Surgical instruments; Neurosurgical devices; Advanced wound care
- Revenue: ▲US$1.64 billion (2025)
- Net income: ▼ −US$516 million (2025)
- Number of employees: approx. 3,946 (Dec. 2023)
- Website: integralife.com

Integra LifeSciences Holdings Corporation is a global medical device manufacturing company headquartered in Princeton, New Jersey. Founded in 1989, the company manufactures products for skin regeneration, neurosurgery, reconstructive and general surgery. Integra artificial skin became the first commercially reproducible skin tissue used to treat severe burns and other skin wounds.

== History ==
Integra LifeSciences was founded by Richard Caruso in 1989 after Caruso licensed Integra artificial skin technology from Harvard–MIT and acquired Colla-tec, a subsidiary of Marion Laboratories. The company became publicly traded under the NASDAQ ticker name IART.

In 1996, Integra artificial skin was approved by the U.S. Food and Drug Administration. The artificial skin, manufactured and patented as Integra, is now used on patients with extensive burns. In 1999, the FDA approved Integra LifeSciences’ DuraGen, an absorbable implant used in neurosurgical and spinal procedures.

In 2001, NMT, a company acquired by Integra in 2002, received FDA approval for Licox, a brain tissue oxygen and temperature monitor. Licox is used to treat patients in critical care, including those suffering from traumatic brain injuries.

In 2002, the FDA approved the use of Integra Dermal Regeneration Template for reconstructive surgery of burn scars. In 2016, IDRT received premarket approval from the FDA for the treatment of diabetic foot ulcers.

In 2018, Integra LifeSciences was included in Fortune’s list of Fastest Growing Companies.

In 2023, Integra ranked #59 on Medical Design and Outsourcing’s list of largest medical technology companies in the world.

== Integra artificial skin ==
In 1969, John F. Burke, a surgeon and Harvard Medical School professor, and Ioannis V. Yannas, a mechanical engineering professor of fibers and polymers at MIT, began working on a new form of artificial skin. They created the first commercially reproducible artificial skin, later patented and manufactured as Integra.

Integra is used to treat patients with severe burns. The top layer, made of thin silicone, protects the patient from infection and dehydration, common causes of death after being severely burned. The bottom layer, made of animal tissue, acts as scaffolding where new skin will grow. Compared to traditional skin grafts, the use of Integra reduces pain and scarring.

Integra is also used in plastic surgery, reconstructive surgery, and to treat some forms of cancer and other skin wounds.

== Acquisitions ==
In October 2014, Integra LifeSciences acquired instrumentation lines from Medtronic for $60 million. In January 2014, the company bought Covidien’s Confluent Surgical line of sealants and shields.

In July 2015, Integra LifeSciences acquired TEI Biosciences and TEI Medical and began manufacturing their SurgiMend and PriMatrix product lines. Primatrix, a dermal repair scaffolding product, is used to treat diabetic foot ulcers, burns, and in other procedures.

In January 2017, Integra Lifesciences acquired Derma Sciences for $204 million. Their TCC-EZ Total Contact Cast, used to treat diabetic foot ulcers, reduces pressure and shortens application time compared to a conventional total contact cast.

In October 2017, Integra LifeSciences acquired Johnson & Johnson’s Codman Neurosurgery business for $1.045 billion. The Codman Hakim valve was developed as a new way to treat hydrocephalus.

In January 2021, the company acquired regenerative medicine firm, ACell, for $400M.

In April 2024, Integra completed the acquisition of Acclarent.
