= Richard Caruso =

American businessman (1943–2022)

Richard E. Caruso (1943 – August 12, 2022) was an American entrepreneur, who was the founder and chairman of Integra LifeSciences and other companies. In 2006, Caruso was named the Ernst and Young National Entrepreneur of the Year for the United States.

== Education ==
Caruso received a Bachelor of Science degree from Susquehanna University, a Master of Science in Business Analytics degree from Bucknell University, and a PhD from the London School of Economics.

== Entrepreneurial successes ==
After college, Caruso began his career with PriceWaterhouse & Co in Philadelphia as a certified public accountant. From there, he joined LFC Financial Corporation where he became the executive vice president and a director.

In 1978, Caruso founded The Provco Group, which organizes and provides funding for a variety of entrepreneurs and complex business activities. According to the company’s website, it currently manages more than a half a billion dollars in assets.

In 1982, Caruso founded Tenly Enterprises. Tenly acquired and operated Rustler Steak House before its acquisition by Sizzler.

In 1989, Caruso founded Integra LifeSciences and took it public in August 1995, listing on the National NASDAQ Market under the symbol “IART”. Caruso built Integra by acquiring unused technology from other companies, principally Marion Laboratories, to create a new branch of medicine now known as regenerative medicine. An example of this is Integra Artificial Skin, which generates new skin for burn victims and was one of the first FDA-approved biologically based wound dressings. It received market approval in 1996. Integra LifeSciences has a market capitalization in excess of $6 billion.

In 1996, Caruso became a founding shareholder of Interactive Investor International. This company went public on the NASDAQ and London Stock Exchange before being acquired in 1999 by Advanced Voting Solutions, Inc.

Caruso served on various boards of other organizations including First Sterling Bank, Advanced Voting Solutions, Inc., American Capital Mutual Funds, Museum of the American Revolution and the Medici Archive Project. Caruso was also an advisor to Quaker BioVentures, a venture capital firm, and Infegy, a social media analytics company.

In 1992, Dartmouth Press published Caruso’s book Mentoring in the Business Environment.

== Awards and honors ==
In 2000, Caruso was the recipient of the New Jersey Entrepreneurial Leadership Award in Biomaterial Science. In 2006, Caruso received the prestigious Ernst & Young and Kauffman Foundation sponsored Greater Philadelphia Entrepreneur of the Year Award for his work with Integra LifeSciences Corporation. Subsequently, he went on to Palm Springs, California to win both the National Award in the Health Sciences category as well as the Overall National Entrepreneur of the Year Award.

== Philanthropy ==
Caruso was the founder and director of The Uncommon Individual Foundation, a non-profit foundation that encourages people to become entrepreneurs of their lives. He served on the Boards of Susquehanna University, The Baum School of Art and the Business Performance Group of the London School of Economics.

== Death ==
Caruso died on August 12, 2022, at the age of 79.
