= ACell =

ACell is a biotechnology company based in Maryland, United States. The company works in regenerative medicine, in which it owns several extracellular matrix patents. ACell develops, manufactures and markets products for medical and veterinary applications. The company was founded by Alan R. Spievack, a former associate professor at Harvard Medical School and is currently run by Patrick A. McBrayer.

ACell's extracellular matrix (ECM) is derived from the lamina propria and basement membrane of a porcine Urinary Bladder Matrix (UBM). The lamina propria acts as a scaffold for cell infiltration while the basement membrane encourages the growth of site-specific tissue as the UBM resorbs. The UBM is offered in both sheet and powder form. The powder form is sold under the brand name of MicroMatrix. The company offers products for wound management (Cytal and MicroMatrix), hernia repair (Gentrix) and Pelvic Organ Prolapse repair (Pelvic Floor Matrix).

Over 100 papers have been published related to the use of ACell's MatriStem UBM.

ACell's use of porcine cellular structure, called MatriStem, as a scaffold for human tissue regeneration was named the "medical breakthrough of the year" by Esquire. The claim that pig bladder ground up into "magical pixie dust" was used to regrow Spievak's brother's finger received considerable mainstream coverage. Simon Kay, professor of hand surgery at the University of Leeds, was critical of the claims, and told The Guardian that "There's no clinical evidence to support the claims" and that they are junk science. Ken Muneoka of Tulane University, who works with ACell's scientific advisors on US-government funded investigations into regenerative medicine, said that the news should be viewed with caution because it was not a controlled study.

In January 2021, Integra LifeSciences, a regenerative medicine and surgical instrument company, acquired the ACell for $400 million.
