= Avita Medical =

Australian regenerative medicine company

Avita Medical, Inc.
- Type: Public company
- Traded as: ASX: AVH & Nasdaq: RCEL
- Industry: Regenerative medicine
- Founded: 1993
- Founder: Fiona Wood
- Area served: Global
- Key people: Cary Vance, President & CEO
- Products: ReCell, ReCell Go, Permeaderm, Cohealyx
- Website: avitamedical.com

Avita Medical is a clinical and commercial company developing and marketing a range of regenerative medicine products. The first regenerative medicine product brought to the market by Avita Medical was ReCell spray-on skin for the treatment of burns. The two latest products are PermeaDerm, a transparent, biosynthetic bilayer wound matrix used for temporary wound coverage (temporization) after surgical excision of burns or trauma, and Cohealyx, a bovine-derived collagen dermal matrix used by burn and trauma surgeons to treat severe wounds and full-thickness burns by accelerating blood vessel formation in order to prepare damaged wound beds for skin autografts.

== Company history ==
Originally named "Clinical Cell Culture" and listed on the ASX under the symbol "C3", the company restructured under the name "Avita Medical" in June 2008. In 2015, the company conducted a strategic divestment of its respiratory business, including the Breath-a-Tech and Funhaler products, to support focus on its regenerative products.

Avita Medical is traded both on the Australian stock market under the ticker symbol AVH and on the NASDAQ Capital Market under the ticker symbol RCEL.

== ReCell, spray-on skin ==
ReCell is a device that enables clinicians to treat wounds and skin defects using very small samples of the patient's own cells. The procedure is performed on site at bedside and takes approximately 25 minutes to complete and does not require laboratory facilities, off-site culture of tissues or specialized staff. ReCell is approved in the United States, Europe, the United Kingdom, Australia, New Zealand, Japan and China.

February 12, 2018 AVITA Medical announced that the U.S. Food and Drug Administration (FDA) has approved a significant increase in the number of patients who may be treated in the United States with the ReCell Autologous Cell Harvesting Device under a FDA Compassionate Use Investigational Device Exemption (IDE) program. Under the expanded protocol, up to 88 patients with life-threatening injuries, including severe burns, may be treated with ReCell. This is the fifth expansion to the Compassionate Use protocol for ReCell approved by the FDA and expands by 20 the number of patients who may be treated. Eligible patients are those who have insufficient healthy skin available for standard skin grafting treatment of their injuries and whose treating physicians believe there to be no suitable alternative treatment.

In October 2017, Avita Medical started to raise a goal of $17 million in capital for the product. The company worked with the Biomedical Advanced Research and Development Authority (BARDA) to raise money toward commercializing the product on the U.S. market.

September 28, 2017 Avita Medical announced submission of U.S. FDA Premarket Approval (PMA) Application for the ReCell device for treatment of burn injuries. The PMA submission includes clinical data from the two U.S. randomized, controlled trials with combined enrollment of 131 patients at twelve leading burn centers across the United States. The later trial demonstrated over 30% reduction in donor skin harvesting while achieving comparable near-term healing and long-term scar outcomes for treatment of third-degree burn injuries. Results from the earlier trial demonstrate a 97.5% reduction in donor skin harvested for treatment of second-degree burn injuries. The submission also includes a review of 55 cases of compassionate use of ReCell for extensive burn injuries.

September 21, 2017 Avita Medical announced the execution of an expanded contract option valued at approximately US$24.3 million. This newly executed contract option establishes funding for key clinical and health economics research in U.S. pediatric burn care and extends Avita's Project Bioshield contract through to September 2022. Avita Medical has had a strong relationship with BARDA since the execution of a five-year contract in September 2015. Under the base contract BARDA made an initial investment of US$16.9 million to support Avita's ongoing U.S. clinical regulatory program towards FDA Premarket Approval (PMA), and to procure 5,000-plus ReCell devices. The contract also allowed BARDA to exercise future options to support additional clinical trials, and provide surge capacity for up to another 20,000 ReCell devices. Supplemental funding worth up to US$7.96 million was also provided to Avita under the contract in June 2016, to provide further operational support to Avita's PMA preparation and Compassionate Use program.

On September 20, 2018, Avita Medical's ReCell wound care device received FDA PMA approval.

== US Government grant ==
In 2009 the United States Armed Forces Institute of Regenerative Medicine provided Avita with a US$1.45 million grant to hasten the approval of the ReCell kit with the U.S. Food and Drug Administration.

== Necrotizing fasciitis ==
In 2018 a burn center in Phoenix, Arizona held a press conference to discuss the ongoing results of using ReCell to treat a woman with flesh-eating bacteria also known as necrotizing fasciitis.
