= Diabetic foot infection =

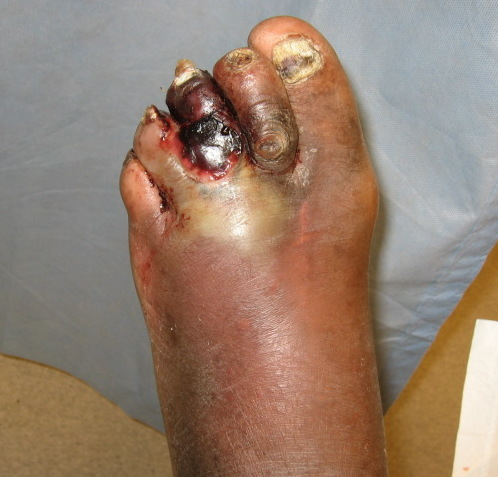
- Gas gangrene due to diabetes
- Symptoms: Pus from a wound, redness, swelling, pain, warmth
- Complications: Infection of the bone, tissue death, sepsis, amputation
- Causes: Diabetic foot ulcer
- Diagnostic method: Based on symptoms
- Differential diagnosis: Phlegmasia cerulea dolens, ischemic limb
- Prevention: Appropriate shoes
- Treatment: Wound care, antibiotics, hyperbaric oxygen therapy
- Frequency: Common

Diabetic foot infection is any infection of the foot in a diabetic person. The most frequent cause of hospitalization for diabetic patients is due to foot infections. Symptoms may include pus from a wound, redness, swelling, pain, warmth, tachycardia, or tachypnea. Complications can include infection of the bone, tissue death, amputation, or sepsis. They are common and occur equally frequently in males and females. Older people are more commonly affected.

They most often form following a diabetic foot ulcer, though not all foot ulcers become infected. Diabetic foot ulcers can be caused by vascular disease or neuropathy and its prevalence occurs in approximately 25% of diabetics throughout their lifetime. Some risk factors for developing diabetic foot infections include history of repeated foot ulcers, foot ulcers lasting for longer than 30 days, poor control over blood glucose levels, peripheral neuropathy, renal impairment, peripheral artery disease, injury or trauma to foot, walking barefoot frequently, and history of amputation in lower limbs. Most diabetic foot infections are polymicrobial (contain multiple infective organisms), and bacteria that are commonly involved include staphylococcus, including methicillin resistant staphylococcus aureus (MRSA), streptococci, pseudomonas, and gram-negative bacteria. Previously, MRSA infections were usually acquired from hospital settings, however, recently MRSA infections acquired from the community are becoming more prevalent and are linked to poor treatment outcomes for diabetic patients. Some risk factors for developing MRSA infections include use of antibiotics that cover a broad spectrum of pathogens for a long duration of time, prolonged hospital stay, or certain surgical procedures. The underlying mechanism of diabetic foot infections often involves poor blood flow and peripheral neuropathy. Diagnosis is based on symptoms and may be supported by deep tissue culture.

Treatment involves proper wound care and antibiotics. Pseudomonas aeruginosa empiric therapy is not warranted unless the patient had a previous infection with a culture identifying the organism, or if the patient has risk factors for it such as frequent use of wet dressings or living in hot climates. MRSA empiric therapy is also not warranted unless the patient has a critical infection such as sepsis, if the rate of MRSA infections are particularly high in a local area, or if the patient had a previous MRSA infection. The duration of antibiotics depends on the severity of infection, ranging anywhere from 1–12 weeks. Treatment of mild-moderate infections should last 1–2 weeks and typically requires oral antibiotics that cover staphylococci and streptococci. Severe infections typically require IV antibiotics that cover more pathogens, such as gram positive organisms, gram negative organisms, and obligate anaerobes to allow for better treatment outcomes. Total antibiotic treatment of severe infections should be approximately 2–3 weeks or more, depending on how extensive the infection is. Prevention includes wearing appropriate shoes, regular foot examinations, and control of risk factors.

== Mechanism ==
Neuropathy, peripheral artery disease, and trauma contribute individually and in combination to the pathophysiology of diabetic foot infections.

=== Neuropathy ===
Diabetes causes a symmetric polyneuropathy that may affect motor and sensory neurons. Intrinsic atrophy of foot and ankle muscles leads to anatomic changes of the foot arch, most commonly depressing the metatarsal heads and creating high pressure zones. Neuropathy is present in approximately 60% of patients who develop foot ulcers and are also diabetic. Neuropathy can lead to a loss of sensation for diabetics in their feet, therefore when there is any trauma/injury or foot ulcer present in these patients it can take awhile for patients to notice; this can lead to an infection developing and worsening while the patient is unaware due to the loss of sensation and lack of pain. In combination with decreased sensation in the lower extremities, repetitive trauma from walking can lead to ulceration. Poor foot care, including lack of moisturizing and frequent self-examination of the feet can exacerbate this.

=== Peripheral artery disease ===
Metabolic changes in diabetes, including hyperglycemia, lead to increased likelihood of -hyperlipidemia and developing atherosclerosis. In diabetes, this atherosclerosis is preferentially distributed to the posterior and anterior tibial arteries, decreasing perfusion to the lower extremities. This may lead to loss of skin integrity, ischemic ulcers, and gangrene.

Infection may vary in the depth of tissue to which it extends. Foot infections range from the most superficial, cellulitis, to deeper soft tissue necrotizing fasciitis, which may necessitate limb amputations or become life-threatening. Infections may also extend to bone, termed osteomyelitis. Infections are commonly polymicrobial and involve antibiotic-resistant strains of organisms e.g. MRSA (Methicillin-resistant Staphylococcus aureus).

== Diagnosis ==
Initial diagnosis of diabetic foot infections is made primarily via thorough history and physical to include visual inspection of the feet, evaluation of any wounds, distal pulses, and neurologic function.

=== History and physical ===
History should be taken for known recent foot trauma, and the lower extremities should be inspected for signs of recent trauma, including redness, induration, edema, visible ulceration with exudate or pus, or bony deformity. Ulcers do occur in the absence of pathological infection. Diagnosis of an infected wound is classically made with ≥2 signs of inflammation or purulence. Peripheral pulses should also be evaluated (posterior tibial and dorsal pedis), and if not palpable, should be further evaluated using ultrasound. In patients with non-palpable pulses, evaluation of PAD with an ankle-brachial index should also be performed. Ulceration or deeper wounds should be probed to identify the depth of penetration and determine involvement of bone, which would indicate osteomyelitis. Neurologic testing includes testing peripheral sensation to vibratory stimuli, temperature, pain, along with deep tendon reflexes.

=== Imaging ===
Imaging may also be used for further evaluation. Plain x-ray, the most common initial imaging study, may show fractures, osteomyelitis, gas collection from gas-producing infective organisms, calcification of blood vessels, or foreign bodies. Magnetic resonance imaging (MRI) is useful to determine the depth of soft tissue infection and evaluate for presence of osteomyelitis, especially in patients which do not respond to initial antibiotic therapy. Finally, patency of the lower extremity vasculature may be evaluated by magnetic resonance angiography or ultrasonography If a patient is experiencing a diabetic foot infection for the first time, a plain radiograph should be conducted to look for any bone abnormalities. MRI is more sensitive and specific than a radiograph, and is typically done if osteomyelitis is suspected and the diagnosis is unclear from the radiograph, or if an abscess is suspected in soft tissues.

== Management ==
Acute management of diabetic foot infections generally includes antibiotic therapy, pressure offloading, re-vascularization, if appropriate, and debridement of infected tissues (or amputation if necessary). Hospitalization is more likely needed when lower extremity pulses are absent or when infection penetrates to the level of the fascia or more deeply. Infections with skin gangrene may reflect deep space infection, abscess, and tissue necrosis. When debridement is necessary, wounds are left open so that serial debridements may be performed over the course of the wound's healing.

Antibiotic choice should be guided by deep tissue culture, severity of the infection, presence or absence of osteomyelitis, prior antibiotic treatment, and previous or current MRSA infection. Wounds without confirmed infection should not be treated with antibiotics, nor should be sent for culture. Cultures are not necessarily warranted if a patient has a mild infection and they have not been on any antibiotics recently. Before starting empiric therapy, cultures should be obtained and once results come back from the lab, an appropriate antibiotic with a narrower spectrum should be chosen. Length of treatment depends primarily on severity of infection; skin and superficial soft tissue infections may require treatment for 1–2 weeks while deeper infections (including osteomyelitis) may require 6–12 weeks, including those who undergo surgery.

== Prevention ==
One crucial aspect for prevention of diabetic foot infections is educating patients of what to monitor for and when to follow up with a healthcare professional. Patients should be regularly checking their feet daily, if they are not able to view the bottom of their feet they can use a mirror to aid them. Prevention of diabetic foot infections include regular foot examinations by a healthcare professional as well as maintenance of cardiovascular co-morbidities and risk factors. This maintenance includes proper footwear, regulating blood glucose and hypertension, and limiting cardiovascular risk factors, such as smoking. Patients should avoid exposing their feet to hot water or harsh chemicals, as well should avoid walking barefoot to prevent development of diabetic foot infections. Patients should also be educated about the importance of regularly trimming their toenails and ensuring they are kept short to avoid an infection from developing.

All patients with diabetes should be examined at least yearly if no additional risk factors, but more frequently if present. In those with a prior ulcer or amputation, examinations are needed every 1–2 months.
