= Diabetic foot =

- Other names: Diabetic foot syndrome
- Neuropathic diabetic foot ulcer
- Specialty: Infectious disease, endocrinology, surgery

A diabetic foot disease is any condition that results directly from peripheral artery disease (PAD) or sensory neuropathy affecting the feet of people living with diabetes. Diabetic foot conditions can be acute or chronic complications of diabetes. Presence of several characteristic diabetic foot pathologies such as infection, diabetic foot ulcer and neuropathic osteoarthropathy is called diabetic foot syndrome. The resulting bone deformity is known as Charcot foot.

Due to advanced peripheral nerve dysfunction associated with diabetes (diabetic neuropathy), patients' feet have a dryness of the skin and a reduced ability to feel pain (nociception). Hence, minor injuries may remain undiscovered and subsequently progress to a full-thickness diabetic foot ulcer. Moreover, foot surgery is well tolerated without anaesthesia. The feet's insensivity to pain can easily be established by 512 mN quantitative pinprick stimulation. In diabetes, peripheral nerve dysfunction can be combined with peripheral artery disease (PAD) causing poor blood circulation to the extremities (diabetic angiopathy). Around half of the patients with a diabetic foot ulcer have co-existing PAD. Vitamin D deficiency has been recently found to be associated with diabetic foot infections and increased risk of amputations and deaths. Research estimates that the lifetime incidence of foot ulcers within the diabetic community is around 15% and may become as high as 25%. Where wounds take a long time to heal, infection may set in, spreading to bones and joints, and lower limb amputation may be necessary. Foot infection is the most common cause of non-traumatic amputation in people with diabetes.

== Prevention ==
Prevention of diabetic foot may include optimising metabolic control via the regulation of blood glucose levels; identification and screening of people at high risk for diabetic foot ulceration, especially those with advanced painless neuropathy; and patient education in order to promote foot self-examination and foot care knowledge. Patients would be taught routinely to inspect their feet for hyperkeratosis, fungal infection, skin lesions and foot deformities. Control of footwear is also important as repeated trauma from tight shoes can be a triggering factor, especially where peripheral neuropathy is present. Evidence is limited that low-quality patient education courses have a long-term preventative impact.

Foot screening guidelines have been previously reviewed, with a view to examining their completeness in terms of advancement in clinical practice, improvements in technology, and changes in socio-cultural structure. Results suggested that limitations of available guidelines and lack of evidence on which the guidelines were based were responsible for the gaps between guidelines, standard clinical practice, and development of complications. It concluded that for the development of standard recommendations and everyday clinical practice, it was necessary to pay more attention to both the limitations of guidelines and the underlying evidence.

According to a 2011 meta-analysis of randomised controlled trials, only foot temperature-guided avoidance therapy was found beneficial in preventing ulceration.

=== Prediction ===
Monitoring a person's feet can help in predicting the likelihood of developing ulcers. A common method for this is using a special thermometer to look for spots on the foot that have higher temperature which indicate the possibility of an ulcer developing. At the same time there is no strong scientific evidence supporting the effectiveness of at-home foot temperature monitoring.

The current guideline in the United Kingdom recommends collecting 8-10 pieces of information for predicting the development of foot ulcers. A simpler method proposed by researchers provides a more detailed risk score based on three pieces of information (insensitivity, foot pulse, previous history of ulcers or amputation). This method is not meant to replace people regularly checking their own feet but complement it.

Once ulcers develop, the Wagner and UT scales are two methods that physicians use to determine the severity of the ulcer. These scales are the best known predictors of lower extremity amputations once ulcers develop.

== Treatment ==
Treatment of diabetic foot ulceration can be challenging and prolonged; it may include orthopaedic appliances, surgery and antimicrobial drugs and topical dressings. Growth factors and cell-based therapies have been extensively investigated and applied in the treatment of diabetic foot ulcers.

Most diabetic foot infections (DFIs) require treatment with systemic antibiotics. The choice of the initial antibiotic treatment depends on several factors such as the severity of the infection, whether the patient has received another antibiotic treatment for it, and whether the infection has been caused by a micro-organism that is known to be resistant to usual antibiotics (e.g. MRSA). The objective of antibiotic therapy is to stop the infection and ensure it does not spread.

It is unclear whether any particular antibiotic is better than any other for curing infection or avoiding amputation. One trial suggested that ertapenem with or without vancomycin is more effective than tigecycline for resolving DFIs. It is also generally unclear whether different antibiotics are associated with more or fewer adverse effects.

It is recommended however that the antibiotics used for treatment of diabetic foot ulcers should be used after deep tissue culture of the wound. Tissue culture and not pus swab culture should be done. Antibiotics should be used at correct doses in order to prevent the emergence of drug resistance. It is unclear if local antibiotics improve outcomes after surgery.

== See also ==
- Diabetic dermopathy
- Diabetic foot infection
