= Fiona Wood =

Australian plastic surgeon and burns specialist

Fiona Wood AO FAHMS
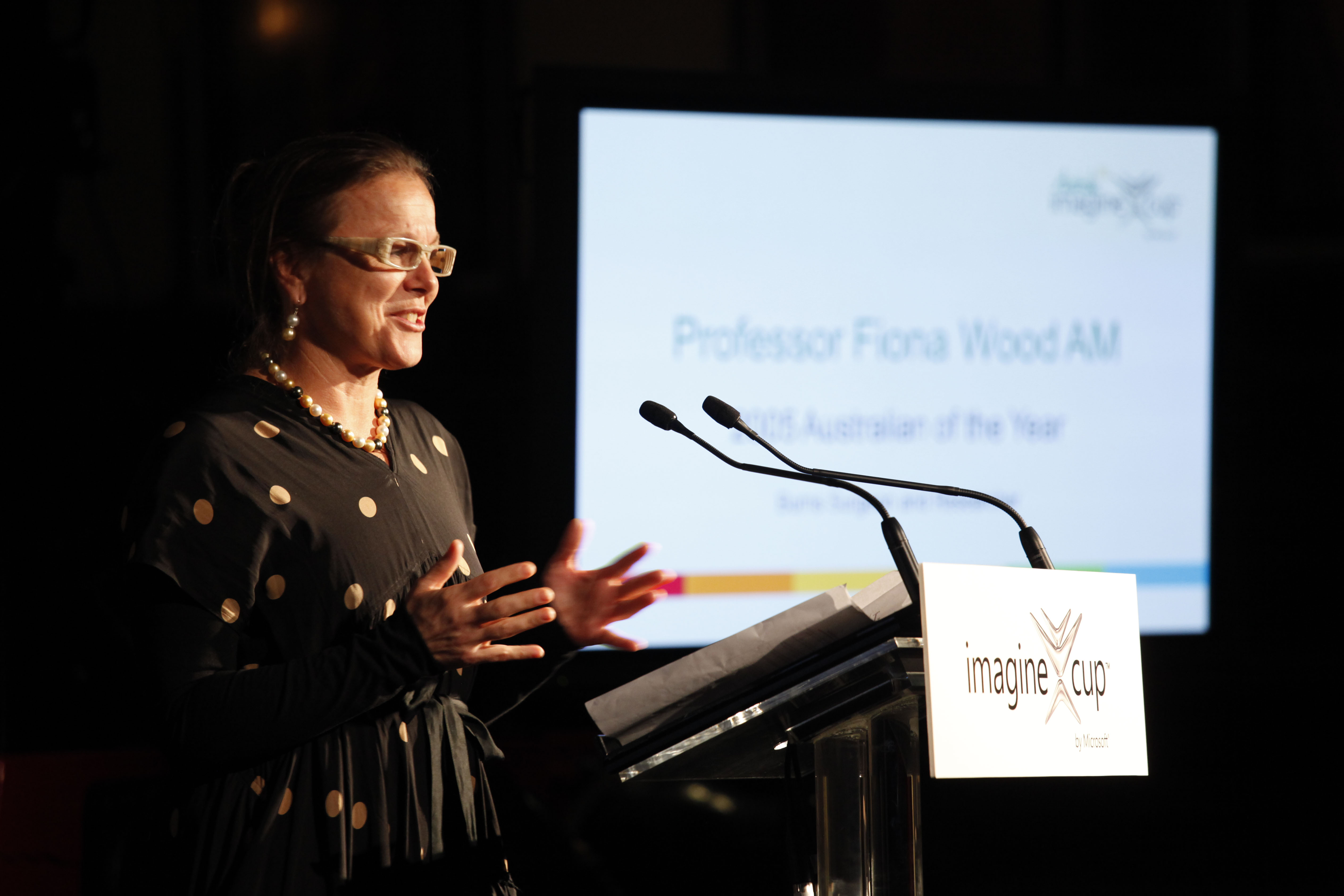
- Wood speaking at the Microsoft Australia Imagine Cup 2012 announcement in Sydney
- Born: Fiona Melanie Wood; 2 February 1958 (age 68); Yorkshire, England
- Citizenship: Australian
- Occupation: Plastic surgeon
- Known for: Spray-on skin
- Spouse: Tony Kierath

Fiona Melanie Wood (born 2 February 1958) is an Australian plastic surgeon and burns specialist working in Perth, Western Australia. She is the director of the Royal Perth Hospital burns unit and the Western Australia Burns Service, and developed spray-on skin in collaboration with Marie Stoner. In addition, Wood is also a clinical professor with the School of Paediatrics and Child Health at the University of Western Australia and director of the Fiona Wood Foundation (formerly the McComb Research Foundation).

== Early life and education ==
Wood was born in Yorkshire, England, on 2 February 1958, the third of four children. Her father Geoff was a miner and her mother Elsie was a physical education teacher. Growing up in relative poverty, Wood's parents pushed their children to get a better education – with her mother transferring to a Quaker school to improve the children's educational opportunities. Wood attended Ackworth School near Pontefract, West Yorkshire. She was athletic as a child and hoped for a career as an Olympic sprinter. In 1978, she was one of twelve women admitted to the St Thomas's Hospital Medical School in London, graduating from there with a Bachelor of Medicine, Bachelor of Surgery in 1981.

== Career and research ==
Wood worked at London's Great Ormond Street Hospital and then at Queen Victoria Hospital before marrying Western Australian born surgeon Tony Kierath and migrating to Perth with their first two children in 1987. She completed her training in plastic surgery between having four more children. In 1991, Wood became the first female plastic surgeon in Western Australia. In 1993, Wood began working with medical scientist Marie Stoner on tissue engineering. They focused on a particularly painful pain point – burn treatments. Through their work, Wood and Stoner were able to greatly decrease skin culturing time and greatly reduce permanent scarring in burns victims.

In October 2002, Wood was propelled into the media spotlight when the largest proportion of survivors from the 2002 Bali bombings arrived at Royal Perth Hospital. She led a team working to save 28 patients who had between 2 and 92 per cent body burns, deadly infections and delayed shock.

She was named a Member of the Order of Australia (AM) in 2003. She was named Australian of the Year for 2005 by Australian Prime Minister John Howard at a ceremony in Canberra to mark Australia Day.

In March 2007, following the crash landing of Garuda Indonesia Flight 200, Wood travelled to Yogyakarta, to assist in the emergency medical response for burn patients.

In 2006, she attracted criticism for publicly endorsing the drug brand Nurofen. The profits from this endorsement went to the McComb Foundation, of which she was the chairwoman. The Australian Medical Association subsequently advised doctors against "endorsement of therapeutic goods". Wood later said of the endorsement that she "would not explore it again because I believe the negative perception outweighs the gain … I believe it was a mistake for me personally".

In 2022, she released her biography, Under her Skin by Sue Williams, with her share of proceeds from the book going to the Fiona Wood Foundation.

=== Spray-on skin ===
Wood has become well known for her patented invention of spray-on skin for burn patients, a treatment which is being continually developed. Where previous techniques of skin culturing required 21 days to produce enough cells to cover major burns, Wood has reduced the period to five days. This reduction hinged on the types of skin harvested; Wood focused her efforts on thinner skin which took less time for enzyme solutions to penetrate. Through research, she found that scarring is greatly reduced if replacement skin could be provided within 10 days. This is because closing the wound quickly greatly decreases the chance of infection, one of the greatest causes of severe scarring. As a burns specialist the Holy Grail for Wood is "scarless woundless healing".

Wood started a company now called Avita Medical to commercialise the procedure. Her business came about after a schoolteacher arrived at Royal Perth Hospital in 1992 with petrol burns to 90% of his body. Wood turned to the emerging US-invented technology of cultured skin to save his life, working nights in a laboratory along with scientist Marie Stoner. The two women began to explore tissue engineering. They moved from growing skin sheets to spraying skin cells; earning a worldwide reputation as pioneers in their field. The company started operating in 1993 and now cultures small biopsies into bigger volumes of skin cell suspensions in as few as five days. This service is used by surgeons in Sydney, Auckland and Birmingham. Cells can be delivered via aircraft and ready for use the next day in many cases. Royalties from licensing will be ploughed back into a research fund, named the McComb Foundation.

As well as receiving much praise from both her own patients and the media, she also attracted controversy among other burns surgeons because spray-on skin had not yet been subjected to clinical trials. A clinical trial was planned in 2005 at Queen Victoria Hospital, England.

In 2009, Wood’s company Avita Medical received US$1.45 million from the United States Armed Forces Institute of Regenerative Medicine to expedite one of the company’s key product offerings, the ReCell kit.

== Awards and honours ==
- Wood was voted the most-trusted Australian in a Reader's Digest poll for six successive years from 2005 to 2010.
- She is an Australian Living Treasure.
- In 2004, Wood won the Western Australia Citizen of the Year award for her contribution to Medicine in the field of burns research.
- In 2015, Wood was elected Fellow of the Australian Academy of Health and Medical Sciences.
- Wood was promoted to Officer of the Order of Australia in the 2024 Australia Day Honours for "distinguished service to plastic and reconstructive surgery, to medical research, and as clinician scientist and mentor".
- In 2026, she was awarded the Royal Medal of the Royal Society.
