= Total contact casting =

Cast designed to take weight of the foot

Total contact casting (TCC) is a specially designed cast designed to take weight off of the foot (off-loading) in patients with diabetic foot ulcers (DFUs). Reducing pressure on the wound by taking weight off the foot has proven to be very effective in DFU treatment. DFUs are a major factor leading to lower leg amputations among the diabetic population in the US with 85% of amputations in diabetics being preceded by a DFU. Furthermore, the five-year post-amputation mortality rate among diabetics is estimated at 45% for those with neuropathic DFUs.

TCC has been used for off-loading DFUs in the US since the mid-1960s and is regarded by many practitioners as the "reference standard" for off-loading the bottom surface (sole) of the foot.

TCC involves encasing the patient's complete foot, including toes, and the lower leg in a specialist cast that redistributes weight and pressure in the lower leg and foot during everyday movements. This redistributes pressure from the foot into the leg, which is more able to bear weight, to protect the wound, letting it regenerate tissue and heal. TCC also keeps the ankle from rotating during walking, which prevents shearing and twisting forces that can further damage the wound.

Effective off-loading is a key treatment modality for DFUs, particularly those where there is damage to the nerves in the feet (peripheral neuropathy). Along with infection management and vascular assessment, TCC is vital aspect to effectively managing DFUs. TCC is the most effective and reliable method for off-loading DFUs.

== History of clinical use ==
The use of TCC for foot ulcers resulting from leprosy (Hansen's disease) was reported by Joseph Khan in India in the 1930s. Research conducted by Paul W. Brand, MD, in the 1940s and 50s, also in India, demonstrated that the wounds in the feet were caused by nerve damage (neuropathy) rather than infection, as previously thought. In his use of TCC to eliminate weight and pressure on the ulcers, he observed the healing of ulcers that had been present for a long time. These seminal observations resulted in the development of treatments to manage neuropathic foot ulcers, which are useful for patients with diabetes.

In 1965, TCC was introduced to the United States by Dr. Brand, then at the National Hansen's Disease Center in Carville, Louisiana. The goal of TCC was to distribute weight over the entire foot and lower leg. Over time, the staff at Carver Hospital refined the method to reduce the development of other wounds that occur in part because of the initial problem with the foot (secondary ulceration).

Materials have changed over the years, from an unmodified plaster of Paris, to formulations containing fiberglass. However, plaster of Paris casts take too long to fully dry and limits patient mobility for up to 74 hours — if the patient walks on the cast during this time, the shape will change, and the cast will not protect the foot and wound correctly. Fiberglass casts were introduced in the 1980s or 1990s. The curing time of a fiberglass cast is far shorter than plaster of Paris, letting the patient walk with an outer boot within an hour of application. Because casts made of fiberglass have lower breakdown rate and do not impede patient mobility, this material has become the choice for TCC.

In 2003, the first TCC casting system that contained all the materials in one package (MedE-Kast Total Contact Casting System) was developed. This innovation helped standardize the application of TCC. Other advancements have been made to make casting easier to learn, easier to apply and less time-consuming.

In 2008, the TCC-EZ Total Contact Casting system became available. In addition to the established benefits of traditional TCC, TCC-EZ also provided an easy to apply casting sock. The one-piece, roll-on, woven design simplified the application process. This cast can be put on in less than ten minutes. The ease of use of TCC EZ has been a driver in the growth of TCC use and has helped increase the accessibility and administration of effective off-loading.

However, despite the availability of specialist kits, there still exists a large "gap in practice" between the accepted gold standard of care and the number of patients currently treated with this standard of care. The US Wound Registry (USWR) data from 2007 to 2013 shows that of 11,784 patients treated for DFUs, only 16% received TCC.

Figure 1 — DFUs caused by pressure, shear and repetitive stresses

== Diabetic foot ulcer overview ==
Neuropathic DFUs are chronic wounds that result from a combination of factors. Some of the main factors that result in DFUs include (Figure 1):

1. Excessive direct pressure (for example, the weight on the feet that naturally results from standing)
2. Shear (usually twisting forces between the skin and footwear)
3. Repetitive stresses (for example, from walking)
4. Peripheral neuropathy (damage to the nerves in the feet).

These factors rarely cause problems in healthy people but the accompanying neuropathy means that the "pain feedback loop" that induces humans to limp or keep their weight off an injury no longer functions properly in diabetic patients. The result is that pressure and abrasion injuries, such as bruising and blisters caused by poor footwear, are not noticed and often ignored, and the continual use of the limb disrupts and damages the healing process.

The healing of DFUs requires many weeks, and patients need to be effectively off loaded during this time. A recent publication on the treatment of DFUs identified that the largest potential improvement in DFU care would come about through adoption of effective off-loading techniques.

== Explanation of off-loading techniques ==
Effective off-loading is not simple, especially because of the extensive healing time often required. Most patients need to remain mobile to continue with daily life, therefore enforced restrained bed rest or sedation are neither convenient nor recommended methods to achieve effective off loading. Instead, various non constraining off-loading methods, from bed rest, crutches and wheelchairs, to complex fixed and removable boots are used to allow the patient continued movement.

Other than bed rest, wheelchairs and crutches, none of which are supported by published clinical evidence as effective methods, off-loading devices (Figure 2) can be functionally classified into two groups:

- Removable devices, which let the patient control the amount of use; and
- Irremovable devices, which are not patient-removable and must be removed or changed by health professionals.

Figure 2 — Examples of off-loading devices

A recent Cochrane review of off-loading devices found that non-removable, pressure-reducing casts were the most effective off-loading devices for DFUs. Although another recent review of the efficacy of different off-loading techniques and devices highlighted a paucity of clinical evidence for many.

Pressure is a major issue for patients with diabetes and an even greater challenge for those who are also obese, because each step taken increases the pressure of bodyweight on each foot by 2 to 2.5 times. It is, therefore, necessary to slow down the rhythm and speed of walking of the patient and reduce the strain rate (defined as force divided by time).

Immobilization of the ankle joint reduces pressure in the forefoot and plantar regions from the propulsion phase of walking, which occurs during forward motion. Both TCCs and removable cast walkers can immobilize the ankle, but TCC ensures constant use by the patient.

TCC reduces the stride length, which slows down the foot and reduces the force applied to the foot. TCC has been shown to reduce plantar pressure by 32%, 63%, and 69% on the fifth, fourth, and first metatarsal heads, respectively; 65% on the great toe; and 45% on the heel. TCC can be used to off-load the heel, but a panel of experts agreed that this approach might not be as effective as for off-loading of forefoot ulcers.

== Clinical evidence for total contact casting ==
The use of TCC as the most effective off-loading method is strongly supported by clinical evidence. Randomized clinical trials provide strong evidence of reduced healing time and greater numbers of healed DFUs for TCC when compared to other methods.

Lavery et al. (2014) showed that TCC had a wound closure rate of 88.9%, compared to 50% for healing sandal and 40% for shear-reducing walking boot. They also showed that median time to healing for TCC was 5.4 weeks, compared to 8.9 weeks for a healing sandal and 6.7 weeks for sheer reducing walking boot.

Armstrong et al. (2001) determined that TCC had a healing rate of 88.9%, compared to 65% for a removable cast walker and 58.3% for a half-shoe, and time to healing was least for TCC at 4.8 weeks, compared to 7.2 weeks for the removable cast walker and 8.7 weeks for the half-shoe. This data was reiterated by Lavery almost 14 years later in a newer study (Figure 3).

Figure 3 — Randomized, controlled clinical trial from 2014, comparing total contact casting (TCC), healing sandal (HS) and shear-reducing walking boot (SRB). Data replotted from Lavery et al. 2014.

== New technology ==
There are four options currently available for total contact casting.

Derma Sciences' TCC-EZ Total Contact Cast (acquired by Integra LifeSciences in 2017) treats diabetic foot wounds by reducing pressure and providing additional support. TCC-EZ's woven, prefabricated material rolls onto a patient's leg and reduces application time compared to a conventional total contact cast.

Another new system, TrueKast, has a built in saw for ease in removal. This can prevent forced compliance from the patient and is also risky. Many experienced physicians are concerned putting a saw blade in-between a patient's skin and a hardened layer of fiberglass. Many patients with DFU's have peripheral neuropathy and poses a serious potential hazard.

BSN Medicals' Cutimed (acquired by Svenska Cellulosa Aktiebolaget in 2016) is a traditional fiberglass total contact cast system utilizing top-of-the-line BSN cast tape.

M-Medical provides a traditional fiberglass total contact cast system with patented padding protection preventing iatrogenic lesions. One size fits all.

== Complications ==
Total contact casting is contraindicated in the presence of untreated infection or osteomyelitis and in patients with severe peripheral arterial disease. It should be used with caution in deep or heavily draining wounds and in ataxic, blind or severely obese patients. Patient compliance is also necessary to minimize complications. Patients may require assistance with activities of daily living, such as bathing and sleeping. A TCC may also interfere with the operation of a motor vehicle, and patients should be counseled not to drive if the cast is on the right leg. Moreover, any advanced wound-healing adjunctive therapies that require daily applications may not be suitable for use with patients using a non removable device, such as the TCC. In addition, TCC may cause or exacerbate deformed toenails, ischemia, fungal infection, dermatitis, and claustrophobia. In situations requiring prolonged casting, joint rigidity and muscular atrophy have been documented. The patient should also be advised that certain designs of TCCs might exacerbate postural instability.

Overall, clinical evidence strongly supports the use of TCC in the treatment of DFUs, and the high efficacy of TCC comes with low risk of major complications. TCC should therefore continue to be the gold standard for the treatment of DFUs.
