= Neuropathic arthropathy =

Degeneration of a weight-bearing joint due to loss of sensation

Neuropathic joint disease
- Other names: Charcot neuroarthropathy or diabetic arthropathy
- Specialty: Rheumatology

Neuropathic arthropathy, also known as Charcot neuroarthropathy (English: /ʃɑːrˈkoʊ/ shar-KOH, French: [ʃaʁko]) or diabetic arthropathy, refers to a progressive fragmentation of bones and joints in the presence of neuropathy. It can occur in any joint where denervation is present, although it most frequently presents in the foot and ankle (Charcot's foot, the term was coined by Ralph H. Major in 1928). Charcot's foot develops from an unnoticed trivial bone injury, which will extend with continuing load bearing and, hence, progressing reactive inflammation. This process can be halted (while neuropathy continues) by appropriate unloading, preferably before any significant joint damage has occurred. If not, joint coalescence, stiffness and deformity will result, associated with severely impaired foot function. Such a ruined foot will cause considerable morbidity and mortality due to ulceration, infection and amputation.

The diagnosis of Charcot neuroarthropathy should be considered whenever a patient presents with warmth and swelling around a joint in the presence of neuropathy with impaired nociception. Although counterintuitive, deep dull pain may be present upon load bearing in many cases despite the neuropathy. Some sort of trauma or microtrauma is thought to initiate the cycle but often patients will not remember because of numbness. Misdiagnosis is common.

The goal of treatment is to avoid foot deformity, ulceration, create joint stability, and to maintain a plantigrade foot. Early recognition, patient education, and protection of joints through various offloading methods is important in treating this disorder. Corrective surgery can be considered in cases of advanced joint destruction.

== Epidemiology of the Charcot foot ==
The Charcot foot is a relatively rare disease. Its annual incidence in the diabetic population is 0,074%, which is similar to the incidence of foot fractures in the general population of 0,091% (including ankle fractures 0,094% and metatarsal fractures 0.071%). This finding is consistent with the traumatic nature of the Charcot foot.

== Symptoms and signs ==
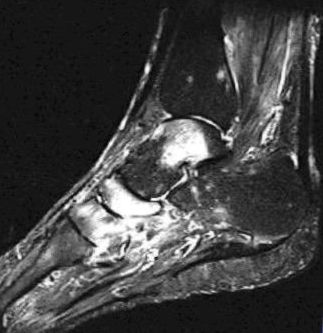
T2-weighted magnetic resonance image showing bone marrow edema (bright) in the calcaneus, navicular and cuneiform bones, equivalent to active Charcot-foot grade 0

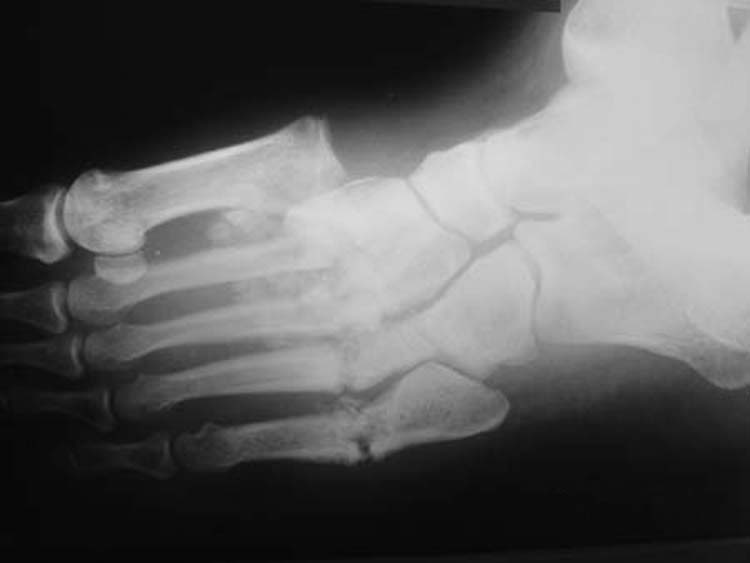
Oblique view X-ray in a 45-year-old male diabetic revealed a divergent, Lisfranc dislocation of the first metatarsal with associated lesser metatarsal fractures. This is equivalent to active Charcot-foot grade 1

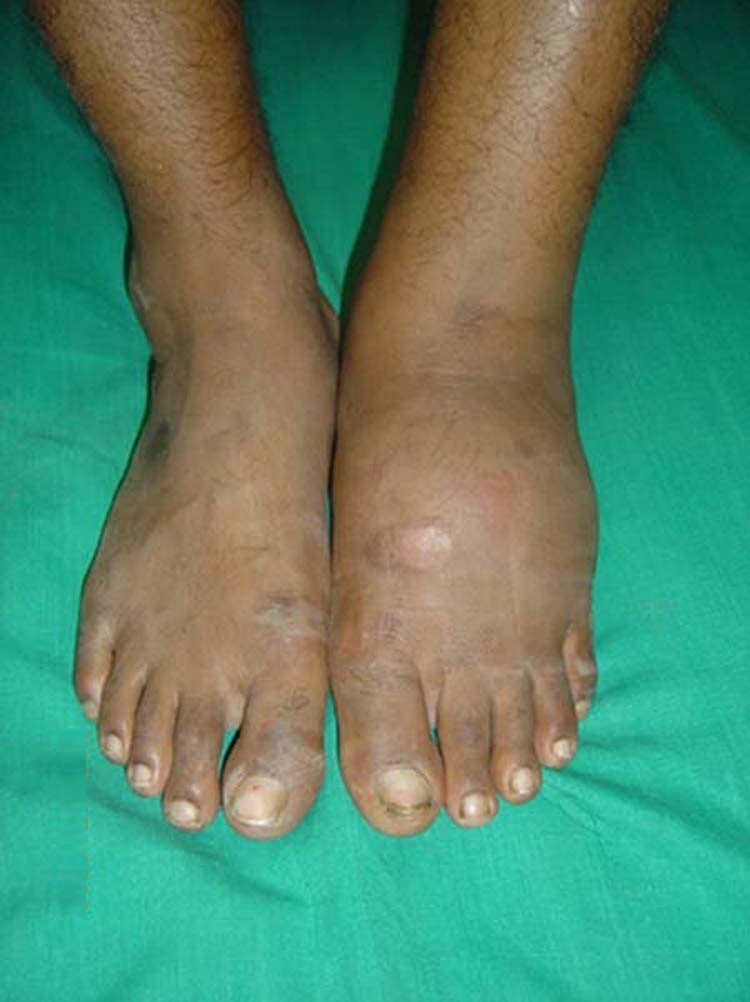
The same 45-year-old man with diabetes mellitus presented with a diffusely swollen, warm and non-tender left foot due to Charcot arthropathy. There are no changes to the skin itself.

The clinical presentation varies depending on the stage of the disease from mild swelling to severe swelling and moderate deformity. Inflammation, erythema, pain and increased skin temperature (3–7 degrees Celsius) around the joint may be noticeable on examination. Magnetic resonance imaging (MRI) reveals bone marrow edema, while radiographs (X-rays) appear normal in the initial stage. In a more advanced stage, X-rays may reveal joint fractures, bone resorption and degenerative changes in the joint. These findings in the presence of intact skin and loss of protective sensation, of nociception in particular, are pathognomonic of acute Charcot arthropathy.

Roughly 75% of patients experience pain, but it is less than what would be expected based on the severity of the clinical and radiographic findings.

== Pathogenesis ==
Any condition resulting in decreased peripheral sensation, nociception, proprioception, and fine motor control can predispose to Charcot foot:

- Diabetic neuropathy (predominantly affecting the feet and legs, with Charcot joints prevalent in 1/600–700 diabetics); the most common in the U.S. today.
- Alcoholic neuropathy
- Cerebral palsy
- Leprosy
- Syphilis (tabes dorsalis), caused by the organism Treponema pallidum
- Spinal cord injury
- Myelomeningocele
- Syringomyelia
- Intra-articular steroid injections
- Congenital insensitivity to pain
- Peroneal muscular atrophy

=== Underlying mechanisms ===
Two primary theories have been advanced:

- Neurotrauma: Loss of peripheral nociception and proprioception leads to repetitive microtrauma to the joint in question; this damage goes unnoticed by the neuropathic patient, and the resultant inflammatory resorption of traumatized bone renders that region weak and susceptible to further trauma. In addition, poor fine motor control generates unnatural pressure on certain joints, leading to additional microtrauma.
- Neurovascular: Neuropathic patients have dysregulated autonomic nervous system reflexes, and de-sensitized joints receive significantly greater blood flow. The resulting hyperemia leads to increased osteoclastic resorption of bone, and this, in concert with mechanical stress, leads to bony destruction. However, bone resorption will stop from effective unloading, while dysregulated autonomic nervous system reflexes persist. Protection from repetitive foot loading also stops inflammatory cytokine overexpression.

In reality, the neurotraumatic mechanism plays a pivotal role in the development of a Charcot joint.

=== Joint involvement ===
Diabetes is the foremost cause in America today for peripheral sensory polyneuropathy and for neuropathic joint disease, and the foot is the most affected region. In those with foot deformity, approximately 60% are in the tarsometatarsal joints (medial joints affected more than lateral), 30% metatarsophalangeal joints, and 10% have ankle disease. Over half of diabetic patients with neuropathic joints can recall some kind of precipitating trauma, usually minor.

Patients with neurosyphilis tend to have knee involvement, and patients with syringomyelia of the spinal cord may demonstrate shoulder deformity.

Hip joint destruction is also seen in neuropathic patients.

== Diagnosis ==
=== Clinical findings ===
In the active stage, clinical findings include erythema, edema and increased temperature in the affected joint, which is not painful. Skin nociception to 512 mN punctate mechanical stimulation is absent. In neuropathic foot joints, plantar ulcers may be present. It is often difficult to differentiate osteomyelitis from a Charcot joint, as they may have similar tagged WBC scan and MRI features (joint destruction, dislocation, edema).

=== Diagnostic imaging findings ===
X-ray, magnetic resonance imaging, computed tomography, ultrasound and nuclear medicine studies may have a role in assessing the Charcot foot. Since 2014, an MRI-based classification of the Charcot foot has become widely accepted, replacing the old X-ray-based Eichenholtz-scheme which suggested an unchangeable progression inevitably ending in bone and joint destruction. The MRI-based classification clearly differentiates between low and high severity grades (grade 0 and 1) and activity stages (active and inactive), providing a perspective for early detection and a rationale for prompt offloading treatment.

Categories of Charcot's arthropathy of the foot (Charcot foot), based on magnetic resonance imaging (MRI).
Severity grade	Active stage	Inactive (healed) stage	Prognosis
Grade 0 = WITHOUT cortical fracture	mild inflammation and edema of the foot, skeletal deformities absent / MRI: microtrabecular fractures, bone bruise, moderate bone marrow edema and soft tissue edema / X-ray: normal	no inflammation, no skeletal deformity / MRI: normal, complete regression of bone marrow and soft tissue edema /X-ray: normal	good: foot form remains normal; function and stability may be limited, however
Grade 1= WITH cortical fracture	severe inflammation, edema, hyperthermia and deformity / MRI: cortical fractures, severe bone marrow and soft tissue edema, severe skeletal deformities / X-ray: cortical fractures, skeletal deformities	no inflammation, but bony deformities and joint ankyloses/ MRI: abnormal, joint dislocations and bone remodelling, residual bone marrow edema, no soft tissue edema / X-ray: abnormal, joint ankyloses and -deformities	poor: foot function is severely limited due to fixated joints; foot stability is reduced; foot remains greatly deformed and requires stiff bespoke footwear with rocker bottom

Sidney Eichenholtz (1909−2000), reviewing in cross-sectional manner the x-rays of 68 cases (with 94 affected joints), had proposed a natural, irreversible evolution of the destructive process. On p 217 of his book Charcot Joints, he wrote: "Three well defined stages are described in the course and development of a Charcot joint:

I. Stage of Development debris, fragmentation, disruption, dislocation.

II. Stage of Coalescence sclerosis, absorption of fine debris, fusion of most large fragments.

III. Stage of Reconstruction and Reconstitution lessened sclerosis, rounding of major fragment, some attempts at reformation of joint architecture."

It needs to be emphasized that the initial MRI-positive, x-ray negative stage of the Charcot-foot (active stage grade 0), which is potentially reversible, was not part of Eichenholtz's scheme.

== Treatment ==
Diabetic foot ulcers should be treated via the VIPs—vascular management, infection management and prevention, and pressure relief. Aggressively pursuing these three strategies will progress the healing trajectory of the wound. Pressure relief (offloading) and immobilization at the acute (active) stage are critical to helping ward off further joint destruction in cases of Charcot foot. Total contact casting (TCC) is recommended, but other methods are also available. TCC involves encasing the patient's complete foot, including toes, and the lower leg in a specialist cast that redistributes weight and pressure in the lower leg and foot during everyday movements. This redistributes pressure from the foot into the leg, which is more able to bear weight, to protect the wound, letting it regenerate tissue and heal. TCC also keeps the ankle from rotating during walking, which prevents shearing and twisting forces that can further damage the wound. TCC aids maintenance of quality of life by helping patients to remain mobile.

There are two scenarios in which the use of TCC is appropriate for managing neuropathic arthropathy (Charcot foot), according to the American Orthopaedic Foot and Ankle Society. First, during the initial treatment, when the breakdown is occurring, and the foot is exhibiting edema and erythema; the patient should not bear weight on the foot, and TCC can be used to control and support the foot. Second, when the foot has become deformed and ulceration has occurred; TCC can be used to stabilize and support the foot, and to help move the wound toward healing.

Walking braces controlled by pneumatics are also used. In these patients, surgical correction of a joint is rarely successful in the long term. However, offloading alone does not translate to optimal outcomes without appropriate management of vascular disease and/or infection. Duration and aggressiveness of offloading (non-weight-bearing vs. weight-bearing, non-removable vs. removable device) should be guided by clinical assessment of healing of neuropathic arthropathy based on edema, erythema, skin temperature changes or the regression of MRI abnormalities. It can take six to nine months for the edema and erythema of the affected joint to recede.

Surgical repair may be compromised by ineffective offloading and immobilisation, allowing fracture elements to move and even hardware to break.

Pharmacotherapy of the active Charcot foot with bisphosphonates, calcitonin, parathyroid hormone, methylprednisolone, or denosumab is of no benefit and, therefore, is not recommended by the recent IWGDF 2023 guidelines.

== Outcome of Charcot-foot ==
Outcomes vary depending on the promptness of establishing immobilisation and offloading, on the location of the disease, the degree of damage to the joint, and whether surgical repair was necessary. Average healing times vary from 55 to 97 days, depending on location. Up to one to two years may be required for complete healing, depending on the patient's compliance with the offloading regimen. The recurrence rate may be considerable.

There is a 30% five year mortality rate independent of all other risk factors.

== Historical note ==
Neuroarthropathy was first described in 1868 by Jean-Martin Charcot (1825–1893) as a painless destruction of a knee in a patient with tabes dorsalis (syphilis). In 1881, the condition was named Charcot's disease, as proposed by Sir James Paget. The first to describe neuroarthropathy of a foot was Herbert Page (1845–1926) in 1881 ("A Case of Tabetic Arthropathy in which the Tarsal Bones of both Feet were involved"), which was referred to by Charcot in 1883 ("pied tabetique"). The term Charcot's foot was used first by Ralph H. Major in 1928. The recent 200th anniversary of Charcot's birthday provided an opportunity for a critical look on Charcot's theory of the neuroarthropathy ("neurogenic bone dystrophy"), which has for long dominated the traditional understanding of the condition. However, this theory has become obsolete with the availability of new imaging techniques like MRI, and the neurotraumatic theory ("arthropathia tabidorum is due to repetitive trauma sustained by a joint that is unable to sense pain") presented by Rudolf Virchow and his followers in 1886 has prevailed ("Charcot neuroarthropathy is a fracture, dislocation, or fracture dislocation in patients with neuropathy").
