= Diabetic foot ulcer =

- Neuropathic diabetic foot ulcer
- Causes: diabetes

Diabetic foot ulcer is a breakdown of the skin and sometimes deeper tissues of the foot that leads to sore formation. It is thought to occur due to abnormal pressure or mechanical stress chronically applied to the foot, usually with concomitant predisposing conditions such as peripheral sensory neuropathy, peripheral motor neuropathy, autonomic neuropathy or peripheral arterial disease. It is a major complication of diabetes mellitus, and it is a type of diabetic foot disease. Secondary complications to the ulcer, such as infection of the skin or subcutaneous tissue, bone infection, gangrene or sepsis are possible, often leading to amputation.

A key feature of wound healing is stepwise repair of lost extracellular matrix (ECM), the largest component of the dermal skin layer. However, in some cases, physiological insult or disorder - in this case, diabetes mellitus - impedes the wound healing process. In diabetic wounds, the inflammatory phase of the healing process is prolonged, delaying the formation of mature granulation tissue and reducing the healing wound's tensile strength.

Treatment of diabetic foot ulcers includes blood sugar control, removal of dead tissue from the wound, wound dressings, and removing pressure from the wound through techniques such as total contact casting. Surgery, in some cases, may improve outcomes. Hyperbaric oxygen therapy may also help but is expensive.

34% of people with diabetes develop a diabetic foot ulcer during their lifetime, and 84% of all diabetes-related lower-leg amputations are associated with or result from diabetic foot ulcers.

== Risk factors ==
Risk factors implicated in the development of diabetic foot ulcers are infection, older age, diabetic neuropathy, peripheral vascular disease, cigarette smoking, poor glycemic control, previous foot ulcerations or amputations, and ischemia of small and large blood vessels. Prior history of foot disease, foot deformities that produce abnormally high forces of pressure, callus at pressure areas renal failure, oedema, impaired ability to look after personal care (e.g. visual impairment) are further risk factors for diabetic foot ulcer.

People with diabetes often develop diabetic neuropathy due to several metabolic and neurovascular factors. Peripheral neuropathy causes loss of pain or feeling in the toes, feet, legs, and arms due to distal nerve damage and low blood flow. Autonomic neuropathy causes Sudomotor dysfunction and dryness of the skin. Blisters and sores may appear on numb areas of the feet and legs, such as metatarsophalangeal joints and the heel region, as a result of pressure or injury which may go unnoticed and eventually become a portal of entry for bacteria and infection.

== Pathophysiology ==
=== Extracellular matrix ===
Extracellular matrix (or "ECM") is the external structural framework that cells attach to in multicellular organisms. The dermis lies below the epidermis, and these two layers are collectively known as the skin. Dermal skin is primarily a combination of fibroblasts growing in this matrix. The specific species of ECM of connective tissues often differ chemically, but collagen generally forms the bulk of the structure.

Through the interaction of a cell with its extracellular matrix (transmitted through the anchoring molecules classed as integrins) there forms a continuous association between the cell interior, cell membrane and its extracellular matrix components that helps drive various cellular events in a regulated fashion. Wound healing is a localized event involving the reaction of cells to the damage sustained.

The cells break down damaged ECM and replace it, generally increasing in number to react to the harm. The process is activated, though perhaps not exclusively, by cells responding to fragments of damaged ECM, and the repairs are made by reassembling the matrix by cells growing on and through it. Because of this, extracellular matrix is often considered as a 'conductor of the wound healing symphony'. In the Inflammatory phase, neutrophils and macrophages recruit and activate fibroblasts which in subsequent granulation phase migrate into the wound, laying down new collagen of the subtypes I and III.

In the initial events of wound healing, collagen III predominates in the granulation tissue. Later on, in the remodeling phase, it gets replaced by collagen I, which gives additional tensile strength to the healing tissue. It is evident from the known collagen assembly that the tensile strength is basically due to fibrillar arrangement of collagen molecules, which self-assemble into microfibrils in a longitudinal as well as lateral manner producing extra strength and stability to the collagen assembly. Metabolically altered collagen is known to be highly inflexible and prone to break down, particularly over pressure areas. Fibronectin is the major glycoprotein secreted by fibroblasts during the initial synthesis of extracellular matrix proteins. It serves important functions, being a chemoattractant for macrophages, fibroblasts, and endothelial cells.

The basement membrane that separates the epidermis from the dermal layer and the endothelial basement membrane mainly contains collagen IV that forms a sheet and binds to other extracellular matrix molecules like laminin and proteoglycans. In addition to collagen IV, the epidermal and endothelial basement membrane also contains laminin, perlecan, and nidogen. Hyaluronic acid, a pure glycosaminoglycan component, is found in high amounts in damaged or growing tissues. It stimulates cytokine production by macrophages and thus promotes angiogenesis. In normal skin chondroitin sulfate proteoglycan is mainly found in the basement membrane, but in healing wounds they are up-regulated throughout the granulation tissue especially during the second week of wound repair where they provide a temporary matrix with highly hydrative capacity. Binding of growth factors is an important role of perlecan in wound healing and angiogenesis. Poor wound healing in diabetes mellitus may be related to perlecan expression. High levels of glucose can decrease perlecan expression in some cells, probably through transcriptional and post-transcriptional modification. Wound healing phases, especially granulation, re-epithelization and remodelling exhibit controlled turnover of extracellular matrix components.

=== Altered metabolism ===
Diabetes mellitus is a metabolic disorder, and hence the defects observed in diabetic wound healing are thought to be the result of altered protein and lipid metabolism and thereby abnormal granulation tissue formation. Increased glucose levels in the body end up in uncontrolled covalent bonding of aldose sugars to a protein or lipid without any normal glycosylation enzymes. These stable products then accumulate over the surface of cell membranes, structural proteins and circulating proteins. These products are called advanced glycation endproducts (AGEs) or Amadori products. Formation of AGEs occurs on extracellular matrix proteins with a slow turnover rate. AGEs alter the properties of matrix proteins such as collagen, vitronectin, and laminin through AGE-AGE intermolecular covalent bonds or cross-linking. AGE cross-linking on type I collagen and elastin results in increased stiffness. AGEs are also known to increase the synthesis of type III collagen that forms the granulation tissue. AGEs on laminin result in reduced binding to type IV collagen in the basement membrane, reduced polymer elongation, and reduced binding of heparan sulfate proteoglycan.

Impaired NO synthesis
Nitric oxide is known as an important stimulator of cell proliferation, maturation and differentiation. Thus, nitric oxide increases fibroblast proliferation and thereby collagen production in wound healing. Also, L-arginine and nitric oxide are required for proper cross-linking of collagen fibers, via proline, to minimize scarring and maximize the tensile strength of healed tissue. Endothelial cell specific nitric oxide synthase (EcNOS) is activated by the pulsatile flow of blood through vessels. Nitric oxide produced by EcNOS, maintains the diameter of blood vessels and proper blood flow to tissues. In addition to this, nitric oxide also regulates angiogenesis, which plays a major role in wound healing. Thus, diabetic patients exhibit reduced ability to generate nitric oxide from L-arginine. Reasons that have been postulated in the literature include accumulation of nitric oxide synthase inhibitor due to high glucose associated kidney dysfunction and reduced production of nitric oxide synthase due to ketoacidosis observed in diabetic patients and pH dependent nature of nitric oxide synthase.

Structural and functional changes in fibroblasts
Diabetic ulcer fibroblasts show various morphological differences compared to fibroblasts from age-matched controls. Diabetic ulcer fibroblasts are usually large and widely spread in the culture flask compared to the spindle-shaped morphology of the fibroblasts in age-matched controls. They often show dilated endoplasmic reticulum, numerous vesicular bodies, and a lack of microtubular structure in transmission electron microscopy study. Therefore, interpretation of these observations would be that despite high protein production and protein turnover in diabetic ulcer fibroblasts, vesicles containing secretory proteins could not travel along the microtubules to release the products outside. Fibroblasts from diabetic ulcer exhibit proliferative impairment that probably contributes to a decreased production of extracellular matrix proteins and delayed wound contraction and impaired wound healing.

Increased matrix metalloproteinases (MMP) activity
For a wound to heal, extracellular matrix not only needs to be laid down but also must be able to undergo degradation and remodeling to form a mature tissue with appropriate tensile strength. Proteases, namely matrix metalloproteinases are known to degrade almost all the extracellular matrix components. They are known to be involved in fibroblast and keratinocyte migration, tissue reorganization, inflammation, and remodeling of the wounded tissue. Due to persistently high concentrations of pro-inflammatory cytokines in diabetic ulcers, MMP activity is known to increase by 30 fold when compared to acute wound healing. MMP-2 and MMP-9 show sustained overexpression in chronic non-healing diabetic ulcers. Balance in the MMP activity is usually achieved by tissue inhibitor of metalloproteinases (TIMP). Rather than absolute concentrations of either two, it is the ratio of MMP and TIMP that maintains the proteolytic balance, and this ratio is found to be disturbed in diabetic ulcers. Despite these findings, the exact mechanism responsible for increased MMP activity in diabetes is not known yet. One possible line of thought considers Transforming growth factor beta (TGF-β) as an active player. Most MMP genes have TGF-β inhibitory element in their promoter regions and thus TGF–β regulates the expression of both MMP and their inhibitor TIMP. In addition to the importance of cell-cell and cell-matrix interactions, all phases of wound healing are controlled by a wide variety of different growth factors and cytokines. To mention precisely, growth factors promote switching of the early inflammatory phase to the granulation tissue formation. A decrease in growth factors responsible for tissue repair, such as TGF-β, is documented in diabetic wounds. Thus, reduced levels of TGFβ in diabetes cases lower the effect of inhibitory regulatory effect on MMP genes and thus cause MMPs to overexpress.

=== Biomechanics ===
Complications in the diabetic foot and foot-ankle complex are wider and more destructive than expected and may compromise the structure and function of several systems: vascular, nervous, somatosensory, and musculoskeletal. Thus, a deeper comprehension of the alteration of gait and foot biomechanics in the diabetic foot is of great interest and may play a role in the design and onset of preventive as well as therapeutic actions.

Briefly, the effect of diabetes on the main structures of the foot-ankle complex can be summarised as:

- Effects on the skin: skin and the soft tissues immediately underneath the skin undergo greater compression and shear loading than usual, thus explaining the onset of tissue damage so deeply correlated to traumatic ulceration processes. Besides this, the skin of the diabetic foot loses autonomic nervous control and consequently reduced hydration, making it less elastic and thus more vulnerable to the action of increased mechanical stress;
- effects on tendons and ligaments: protein glycosylation and the resulting collagen abnormalities lead to greater transversal section – i.e., thickening – of tendons and ligaments and a greater coefficient of elasticity. Particularly affected by this process are the Plantar Fascia and Achilles Tendon. Both causes lead to increased stiffness of those structures.
- Effects on cartilage: similar to what happens to tendons and ligaments, cartilage changes its composition mainly due to the modification of collagen fibers. This increases its stiffness and decreases the range of motion of all joints in the foot and ankle.
- Effects on muscles: Diabetes mellitus causes severe damage to nerve conduction, thus causing a worsening in the management of the related muscle fibers. As a consequence, both intrinsic and extrinsic muscles of the foot-ankle complex are damaged in structure (reduction of muscle volume) and function (reduction of muscle strength);
- Effects on the peripheral sensory system: Impaired nerve conduction has a dramatic effect on the peripheral sensory system since it leads to loss of protective sensation under the sole of the foot. This exposes the diabetic foot to thermal or mechanical trauma, and to the late detection of infection processes or tissue breakdown;
- effects on foot morphology (deformities): due to most of the above alterations, a significant imbalance of peripheral musculature and soft tissue occurs in the foot, which seriously alters its morphology and determines the onset of foot deformities. Most common deformities of the diabetic foot are represented by a high longitudinal arch (rigid cavus foot), hammer toes, and hallux valgus. A completely different morphologic degeneration is represented by neuropathic arthropathy, whose analysis is not part of this discussion.

== Diagnosis ==
Assessment of diabetic foot ulcer includes identifying risk factors such as diabetic peripheral neuropathy, noting that 50 percent of people are asymptomatic, and ruling out other causes of peripheral neuropathy, such as alcohol use disorder and spinal injury. Diabetic foot ulcers are often misdiagnosed in patients with undiagnosed skin malignancies, especially high-risk in elderly patients.

The location of the ulcer, its size, shape, depth, and whether the tissue is granulating or not need to be considered. Further considerations include whether there is malodour, condition of the border of the wound, and palpable bone and sinus formation should be investigated. Signs of infection require to be considered, such as the development of grey or yellow tissue, purulent discharge, unpleasant smell, sinus, undermined edges, and exposure of bone or tendon.

=== Classification ===
Diabetic foot ulcer is a complication of diabetes. Diabetic foot ulcers are classified as either neuropathic, neuroischaemic or ischaemic.

Doctors also use the Wagner Grades to describe the severity of an ulcer. The purpose of the Wagner Grades is to allow specialists to better monitor and treat diabetic foot ulcers. This grading system classifies Diabetic foot ulcers using numbers, from 0 to 5.

Wagner Grades 0 through 5 are as follows:

- 0. No diabetic foot ulcer is present, but there is a high risk of developing one.
- 1. A surface ulcer involves full skin thickness but does not yet involve the underlying tissues.
- 2. A deep ulcer penetrates past the surface, down to the ligaments and muscle. There is no abscess or bone involved yet.
- 3. A deep ulcer occurs with inflammation of subcutaneous connective tissue or an abscess. This can include infections in the muscle, tendon, joint, and/or bone.
- 4. The tissue around the area of the ulcer (limited to the toes and forefoot) has begun to decay. This condition is called gangrene.
- 5. Gangrene has spread from the localized area of the ulcer to become extensive. This involves the whole foot.

== Prevention ==
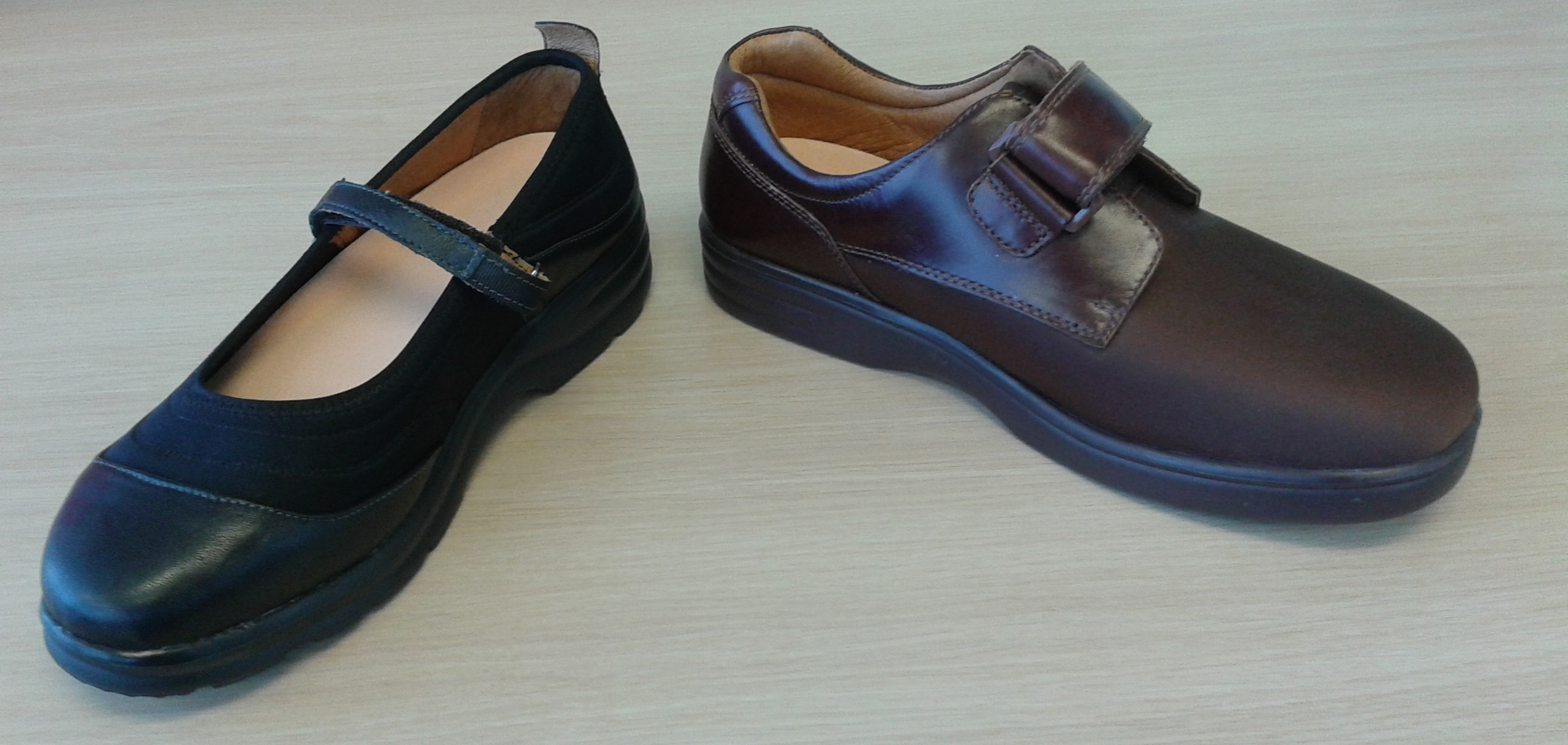
Many diabetic shoes have velcro closures for ease of application and removal.

Steps to prevent diabetic foot ulcers include frequent review by a foot specialist and multidisciplinary team, good foot hygiene, diabetic socks and shoes, as well as avoiding injury. Foot-care education combined with increased surveillance can reduce the incidence of serious foot lesions.

There is no high-quality research that evaluate the complex intervention of combining two or more preventive strategies in preventing diabetic foot ulcer.

=== Monitoring and prediction ===
People with loss of feeling in their feet should inspect their feet on a daily basis to ensure that there are no wounds starting to develop. Monitoring a person's feet can help in predicting the likelihood of developing ulcers.

A common method for this is using a special thermometer to look for spots on the foot that have a higher temperature, which indicate the possibility of an ulcer developing. At the same time there is no strong scientific evidence supporting the effectiveness of at-home foot temperature monitoring.

The current guideline in the United Kingdom recommends collecting 8-10 pieces of information for predicting the development of foot ulcers. A simpler method proposed by researchers provides a more detailed risk score based on three pieces of information (insensitivity, foot pulse, previous history of ulcers or amputation). This method is not meant to replace people regularly checking their own feet, but to complement it.

=== Footwear ===
Diabetic shoes, insoles and socks are personalised products that relieve pressure on the foot in order to prevent ulcers. The evidence for special footwear to treat foot ulcers is poor but their effectiveness for prevention is well-established. Design features of footwear that are effective in reducing pressure are arch supports, cushioned cut-outs around points at risk of damage, and cushioning at the ball of the foot. Technology for measuring the pressure within the shoes is recommended during the design of diabetic footwear.

People with loss of feeling in their feet should not walk around barefoot, but use proper footwear at all times.

== Treatment ==
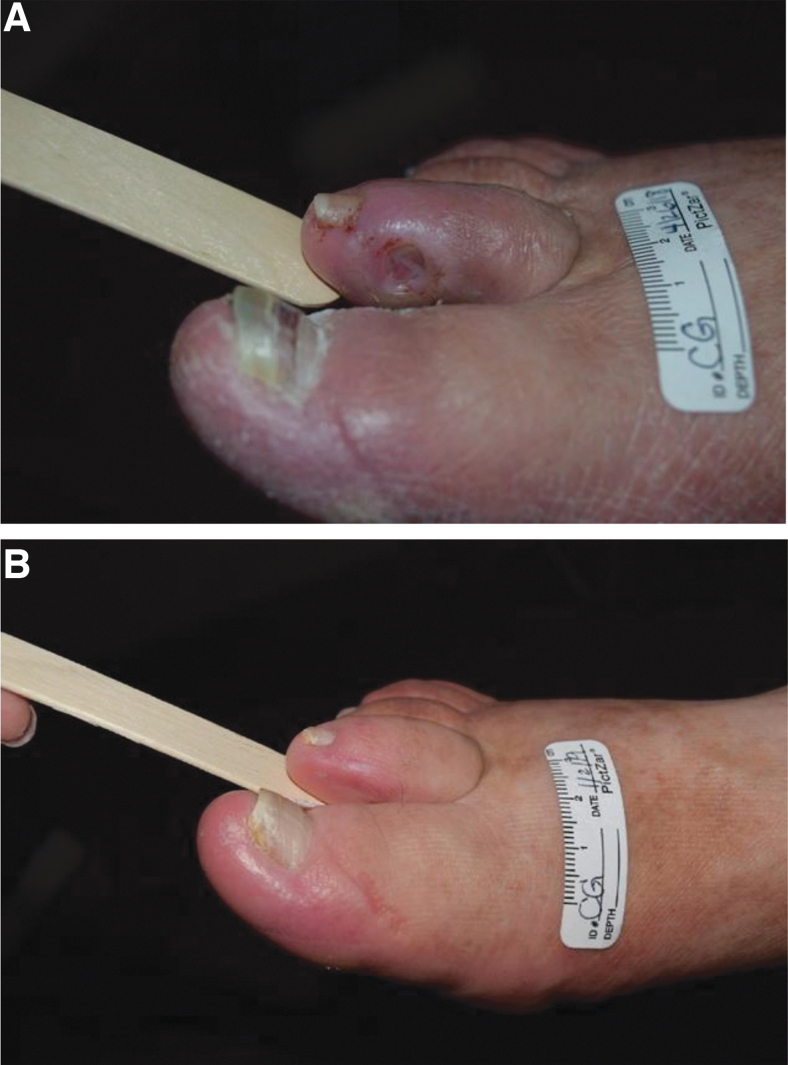
A neuropathic plantar diabetic foot ulcer (Wagner Grade 1) at presentation (top) and after offloading and serial debridement (bottom).

Foot ulcers in diabetes require a multidisciplinary team that may include the primary care doctor, a diabetes nurse specialist, a tissue viability nurse, podiatrists, vascular surgeons, diabetes specialists and surgeons. An aim to improve glycemic control, if poor, may slow disease progression. When osteomyelitis is suspected to be involved in the foot, but not evidenced on an x-ray, an MRI scan should be obtained. In those with a high likelihood of osteomyelitis, a combination of x-ray and being able to probe to bone can reliably diagnose osteomyelitis without the need for more advanced imaging. A bone biopsy with culture is the gold standard for diagnosing osteomyelitis.

With regards to infected foot ulcers, the presence of microorganisms is not in itself enough to determine whether an infection is present. Signs of an infection, such as erythema, purulence, fluctuance, swelling, warmth, or discharge, should also be present. The most common organism causing infection is staphylococcus. The treatment consists of debridement, appropriate bandages, managing peripheral arterial disease and appropriate use of antibiotics (against pseudomonas aeruginosa, staphylococcus, streptococcus and anaerobe strains), and arterial revascularization if necessary.

=== Antibiotics ===
The length of antibiotic courses depends on the severity of the infection and whether bone infection is involved, but can range from 1 week to 6 weeks or more. Current recommendations are that antibiotics are only used when there is evidence of infection and continued until there is evidence that the infection has cleared, instead of evidence of ulcer healing. The choice of antibiotic depends on common local bacterial strains known to infect ulcers. Microbiological swabs are believed to be of limited value in identifying the causative strain. Microbiological investigation is of value in cases of osteomyelitis. Most ulcer infections involve multiple microorganisms.

There is limited safety and efficacy data on topical antibiotics in treating diabetic foot ulcers.

=== Wound dressings ===
There are many types of dressings used to treat diabetic foot ulcers, such as absorptive fillers, hydrogel dressings, and hydrocolloids. There is no good evidence that one type of dressing is better than another for diabetic foot ulcers. In selecting dressings for chronic non-healing wounds, it is recommended that the cost of the product be taken into account.

Hydrogel dressings may have shown a slight advantage over standard dressings, but the quality of the research is of concern. Dressings and creams containing silver have not been properly studied nor have alginate dressings. Biologically active bandages that combine hydrogel and hydrocolloid traits are available; however, more research needs to be conducted as to the efficacy of this option over others.

=== Total contact casting ===
Total contact casting (TCC) is a specially designed cast designed to take the weight of the foot (off-loading) in patients with DFUs. Reducing pressure on the wound by taking the weight of the foot has proven to be very effective in DFU treatment. DFUs are a major factor leading to lower leg amputations among the diabetic population in the US, with 85% of amputations in diabetics being preceded by a DFU. Furthermore, the 5 year post-amputation mortality rate among diabetics is estimated at 45% for those with neuropathic DFUs.

TCC has been used for off-loading DFUs in the US since the mid-1960s and is regarded by many practitioners as the "reference standard" for off-loading the bottom surface (sole) of the foot.

TCC helps patients maintain their quality of life. By encasing the patient's complete foot — including the toes and lower leg — in a specialist cast to redistribute weight and pressure from the foot to the lower leg during everyday movements, patients can remain mobile. TCC redistributes pressure, protects the wound, letting damaged tissue regenerate and heal. TCC also keeps the ankle from rotating during walking, which helps prevent shearing and twisting forces that can further damage the wound.

Effective offloading is a key treatment modality for DFUs, particularly those where there is damage to the nerves in the feet (peripheral neuropathy). Along with infection management and vascular assessment, TCC is a vital aspect to effectively managing DFUs. TCC is the most effective and reliable method for off-loading DFUs.

A 2013 meta-analysis by the Cochrane Collaboration compared the effectiveness of non-removable pressure relieving interventions, such as casts, with therapeutic shoes, dressings, removable pressure relieving orthotic devices, and surgical interventions. Non-removable pressure-relieving interventions, including non-removable casts with an Achilles tendon lengthening component, were found to be more effective at healing foot ulcers related to diabetes than therapeutic shoes and other pressure-relieving approaches.

TCC systems include TCC-EZ (Integra LifeSciences) and Cutimed Off-loader (BSN Medical).

=== Hyperbaric oxygen ===
In 2015, a Cochrane review concluded that for people with diabetic foot ulcers, hyperbaric oxygen therapy reduced the risk of amputation and may improve the healing at 6 weeks. However, there was no benefit at one year, and the quality of the reviewed trials was inadequate to draw strong conclusions.

=== Negative pressure wound therapy ===
This treatment uses vacuum to remove excess fluid and cellular waste that usually prolongs the inflammatory phase of wound healing. Despite a straightforward mechanism of action, the results of negative pressure wound therapy studies have been inconsistent. Research needs to be carried out to optimize the parameters of pressure intensity, treatment intervals, and exact timing to start negative pressure therapy in the course of chronic wound healing.

There is low-certainty evidence that negative pressure wound therapy would improve wound healing in diabetic foot ulcers.

=== Other treatments ===
Ozone therapy – There is only limited and poor-quality information available regarding the effectiveness of ozone therapy for treating foot ulcers in people with diabetes.

Growth factors - There is some low-quality evidence that growth factors may increase the likelihood that diabetic foot ulcers will heal completely.

Continuous diffusion of oxygen (CDO) - CDO delivers continuous oxygen to an occluded, moist wound site at much lower flow rates of 3–12 mL/h for 24 h 7 days a week for up to several weeks or months, depending on the wound status.

Phototherapy - There is very weak evidence to suggest that people with foot ulcers due to diabetes may have improved healing. There is no evidence to suggest that phototherapy improves the quality of life for people with foot ulcers caused by diabetes.

Sucrose-octasulfate impregnated dressing is recommended by the International Working Group on the Diabetic Foot Ulcer (IWGDF) for the treatment of non-infected, neuro-ischaemic diabetic foot ulcers that do not show an improvement with a standard of care regimen

Autologous combined leucocyte, platelet and fibrin as an adjunctive treatment, in addition to best standard of care is also recommended by IWGDF However, there is only low quality evidence that such treatment is effective in treating diabetic foot ulcer.

There is limited evidence that granulocyte colony-stimulating factor may not hasten the resolution of diabetic foot ulcer infection. However, it may reduce the need for surgical interventions such as amputations and hospitalizations.

It is unknown whether intensive or conventional blood glucose control is better for diabetic foot ulcer healing.

A 2020 Cochrane systematic review evaluated the effects of nutritional supplements or special diets on healing foot ulcers in people with diabetes. The review authors concluded that it's uncertain whether nutritional interventions have an effect on foot ulcer healing and that more research is needed to answer this question.

Skin grafting and tissue replacements can help improve the healing of diabetic foot ulcers.

A 2021 systematic review concluded that there was no strong evidence about the effects of psychological therapies on diabetic foot ulcer healing and recurrence.

== Epidemiology ==
Approximately 34% of people with diabetes (Type 1 or Type 2 diabetes) will develop a foot ulcer in their lifetime. 18.6 million people worldwide will develop a foot ulcer each year. 15-20% of moderately to severely infected foot ulcers eventually lead to amputation, and the mortality rate of diabetic foot ulcers is 30% at 5 years with a mortality rate of 70% in those with a foot ulcer who receive an above the foot amputation. Foot ulcers and amputations are associated with a reduced quality of life. In the United States, Black people, Native Americans, Hispanics, and those living in rural areas or those with a lower socioeconomic status have an increased rate of amputations due to diabetic foot ulcers.

Approximately 8.8 percent of hospital admissions of diabetic patients are for foot-related problems, and such hospital admissions are about 13 days longer than for diabetics without foot-related admissions. Approximately 58% of ulcers recur within 3 years and up to 65% recur within 5 years, sometimes at a different location that the original ulcer. Diabetic foot disease is the leading cause of non-traumatic lower limb amputations.

== Research ==
Stem cell therapy may represent a treatment for promoting the healing of diabetic foot ulcers. Diabetic foot ulcers develop their own, distinctive microbiota. Investigations into characterizing and identifying the phyla, genera, and species of nonpathogenic bacteria or other microorganisms populating these ulcers may help identify one group of microbiota that promotes healing.

The recent advances in epigenetic modifications, with special focus on aberrant macrophage polarisation, are giving increasing evidence that epigenetic modifications might play a vital role in changing the treatment of diabetic foot ulcer in the near future.
