= Ioannis Yannas =

Greek-American engineer (1935–2025)

Ioannis V. Yannas (14 April 1935 – 19 October 2025) was a Greek-American engineer and a professor at the Massachusetts Institute of Technology.

Yannas emigrated to the United States to pursue undergraduate and graduate degrees completing his bachelor's at Harvard College in 1957, a Master of Arts at the Massachusetts Institute of Technology in 1959, then a master's of science and doctorate at Princeton University in 1965 and 1966, respectively.

He was a member of the National Academy of Medicine and Engineering, elected in 1978 and 2017, respectively. He was elected a fellow of the American Institute for Medical and Biological Engineering in 1993, and inducted into the National Inventors Hall of Fame in 2015.

Yannas is known for the invention, with John F. Burke, of synthetic skin.

Yannas died on 19 October 2025, at the age of 90.
