= Spray-on skin =

Skin culturing treatment for burn or other skin damage victims

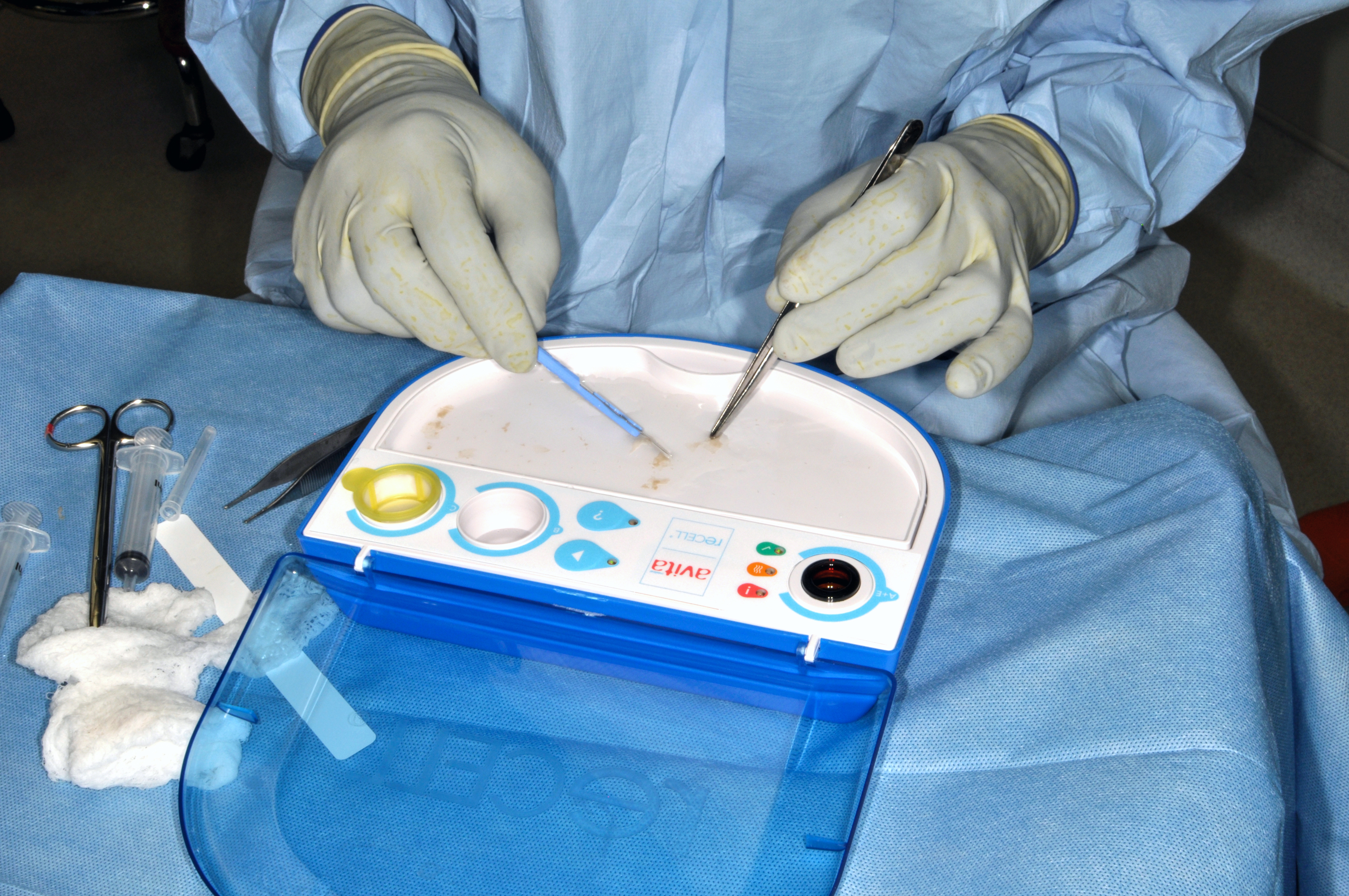
Preparation of spray-on skin using a ReCell device

Spray-on skin is a skin culturing treatment for burn, or other skin damage victims. It involves taking small samples of the patient's skin and spraying them on the wound.

== History ==
The treatment was developed by Marie Stoner and plastic surgeon Fiona Wood. Their technique worked quicker than previous skin culturing techniques. Wood established the company Avita Medical in 1993 to commercialise the procedure.

After the 2002 Bali bombings, Wood used the experimental technology on victims before it had been subjected to proper clinical trials, garnering criticism from other burn specialists since at the time there was little evidence of its efficacy, and Wood had an apparent conflict of interest since she founded the company that sold the technology.

A 2006 clinical trial in the US attracted only small numbers of participants and was suspended by Avita. Clinical trials commenced again in 2010 with the assistance of a grant from the US Army. Participant rates for the new trial were again lower than expected.

The technology is currently approved for use in Australia, Europe, Britain and North America.
