= Pediatric burn =

Skin injury to someone under 18

- Other names: Burns in children
- Specialty: Emergency medicine, plastic surgery

A pediatric burn is an injury to the skin or underlying tissue in persons under the age of 18, and is globally the most common type of pediatric injury. Burns can be caused by heat, cold, chemical or irritation. Most burns do not require hospital admission but a small percentage are serious and need to be transferred to specialist burn centers, where a multidisciplinary team of specially trained doctors, including surgeons and anesthesiologists can care for the child. Mortality rates at centers like this at are recorded at 3%.

== Signs and symptoms ==
There are three types of burns;

- Superficial burn
- Partial thickness burn
- Full thickness burn

Depending on the type of burn that has occurred, there will be different signs and symptoms.

A superficial burn has damaged the epidermis, and this appears as redness.

A partial thickness burn has damaged the epidermis and underlying dermis, and is red, painful and often blisters

A full thickness burn has damaged the epidermis and the entire dermis, nerves and skin appendages. These burns are often described as painless as the nerve endings have been burned so they can no longer transmit pain along their axon. These burns are white in appearance as the capillaries have been damaged, the skin is leathery.

== Cause ==
Up to 70% of children's burns are as a result of scalds, where the child is exposed to hot liquids e.g. spilling hot water or a hot bath. neglected children's are also a risk factors for burns

== Risks ==
There are several risk factors for pediatric burns;

More burns are reported in under 15-year-old boys than girls and more burns are recorded in children living in urban areas than rural areas.

== Treatment ==
To determine the management strategy of any burn, it is essential that the Total Burn Area is calculated. This differs from an adult to a child as the total body surface area is divided up differently for a child and for an adult- mainly as a child's head takes up a larger percentage of the TBSA than it does in a fully developed adult. A doctor will assess the burns and calculate the total area of the child's body that is covered in the burn and from there will determine the course of treatment depending on the extent of the burns. Depending on the TBSA the patient may be transferred to a specialist burn unit for specialized care, however often patients that are transferred to these units have had their TBSA overestimated in the hospital that they presented too and perhaps did not require the referral. Depending on the TBSA the management of the patient will differ, for example an adult burn <10% TBSA is classified as a minor burn however in a young patient a minor burn is classified as <5% TBSA and for moderate burns in adults is classified as 10-20% TBSA and in a child is 5-10% TBSA. All child burns which are >10% TBSA are referred to specialized center to management.

Fluid resuscitation is an initial management step of all major burns, with the objective to replace the fluid that has been lost due to the burn and to re-establish the normal fluid level in the child, without overloading with fluid. To determine how much fluid to give the Parkland formula is often used-4 times the weight of the patient (kg) times the total burn surface area (TBSA). Once this has been calculated, half of this volume is to be given to the patient in the first 8 hours from the time the burn occurred (adjusted if the patient presents later to hospital) and the remaining volume to be given over the next 16 hours, therefore the total volume is given over 24 hours. The fluid is given to ensure that there is enough volume flowing around the body so tissues are not starved of oxygen or nutrients. However, the Parkland Formula has often underestimated the needs of children in this case, especially those with inhalation injuries.

Patients with severe burns may be treated with surgery to remove the burnt area and at a later stage be offered skin graft over the area, this is made difficult in patients with a large TBSA as they have limited areas where grafts could be taken. In child with severe burns, surgery is often needed to change dressings that are covering the burn as it is too difficult to do this successfully due to the pain associated with this. Depending on the anatomical location of the burn, at a later stage after the burn has healed and there are no signs of infection the patient may be offered surgery to release the burn so that their movement is not restricted.

=== Management ===
It is important to remember that some child burns are not accidental and health care workers need to observe for suspicious injuries in children. Non-accidental child burns are more common in low income households, families with a single parent or young parents. Social services may also be contacted when the burn injury is thought not to be deliberate but perhaps due to inadequate supervision of the child.

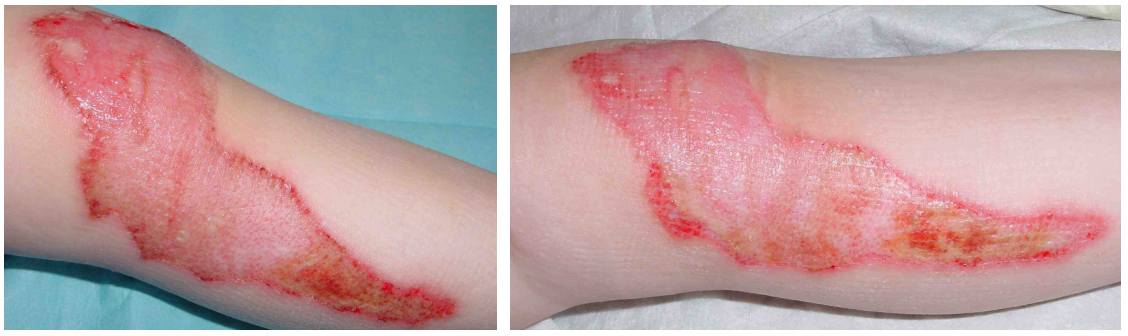
WIRA-Wiki-GH-009-Burn-wound-improvement-with-wIRA
