= John F. Burke =

American medical researcher

John Francis Burke
- Born: July 22, 1922; Chicago, Illinois
- Died: November 2, 2011 (aged 89); Lexington, Massachusetts
- Education: University of Illinois; Harvard Medical School
- Occupation: Medical researcher
- Spouse: Agnes Redfearn Goldman (m. 1952)

John Francis Burke (July 22, 1922 – November 2, 2011) was an American medical researcher at Harvard University widely known for his co-invention of synthetic skin in 1981, together with Dr. Ioannis V. Yannas. Burke was also widely noted for developing a system of infection control in hospitals and showing that antibiotics given before surgery lower risks of post-operative infections. Burke was head of the Shriners Burns Institute and chief of trauma services at Massachusetts General Hospital, a professor of surgery at Harvard University.

== Life ==
Burke was born in Chicago, Illinois on July 22, 1922. His father, Francis A. Burke, was a railroad man; his mother was Mary Biaggi.

In 1952, he married Agnes Redfearn Goldman. They had four children, three sons and a daughter.

== Career ==
Burke attended the University of Illinois and received a degree in chemical engineering in 1947. He received his medical degree from Harvard Medical School in 1951. He enlisted the day after Pearl Harbor and became an Army Air Corps pilot. He flew P-51 and P-38 fighters. After World War II, he worked at Massachusetts General Hospital and Harvard Medical School.

Burke studied the use of antibiotics in the perioperative period to reduce the risk of bacterial infection.

He participated in a number of major advances in burn care. Burke performed experimental and clinical work at Shriners Burns Institute (now known as Shriners Hospital for Children – Boston).

=== Appointments ===
- President of the American Burn Association (1981-1982)
- Board of Directors of the American Trauma Society (1982-1988)
- President of the Surgical Infection Society (1983-1984)
- President of the Boston Surgical Society (1984-1985)
- Chairman of the General Clinical Research Center Committee of the National Institute of Health (1987-1988)
- Governor the American College of Surgeons (1988-1992)
- President of the New England Surgical Society (1989-1990)

== Death ==
Burke died on November 2, 2011 in Lexington, Massachusetts.

== Awards ==
- Cutty Sark Science Award (1982)
- Founders Award of the Society of Biomaterials (1982)
- Nathan Smith Distinguished Service Award from the New England Surgical Society (1984)
- Joseph Sussman Memorial Award (1987)
- Distinguished Alumni Award of the University of Illinois (1991)
- Harvey Stuart Allen Distinguished Service Award from the American Burns Association (1993)
- Tanner Vandeput-Boswick Burn Prize in Paris (1994)
- Whittaker International Burn Prize in Italy (1996)
- Jacobson Innovation Award of the American College of Surgeons (1999)
- Distinguished Service Award from the American Association of Tissue Banks (2000)
- Prize of the International Society of Surgery/Societe Internationale de Chirurgie (2003)
- Honorary Award from the American Association of Plastic Surgeons (2008)
- National Inventors Hall of Fame (2015)
