= History of wound care =

The history of wound care spans from prehistory to modern medicine. Wounds naturally heal by themselves, but hunter-gatherers would have noticed several factors and certain herbal remedies would speed up or assist the process, especially if it was grievous. In ancient history, this was followed by the realisation of the necessity of hygiene and the halting of bleeding, where wound dressing techniques and surgery developed. Eventually the germ theory of disease also assisted in improving wound care.

== Ancient medical practice ==
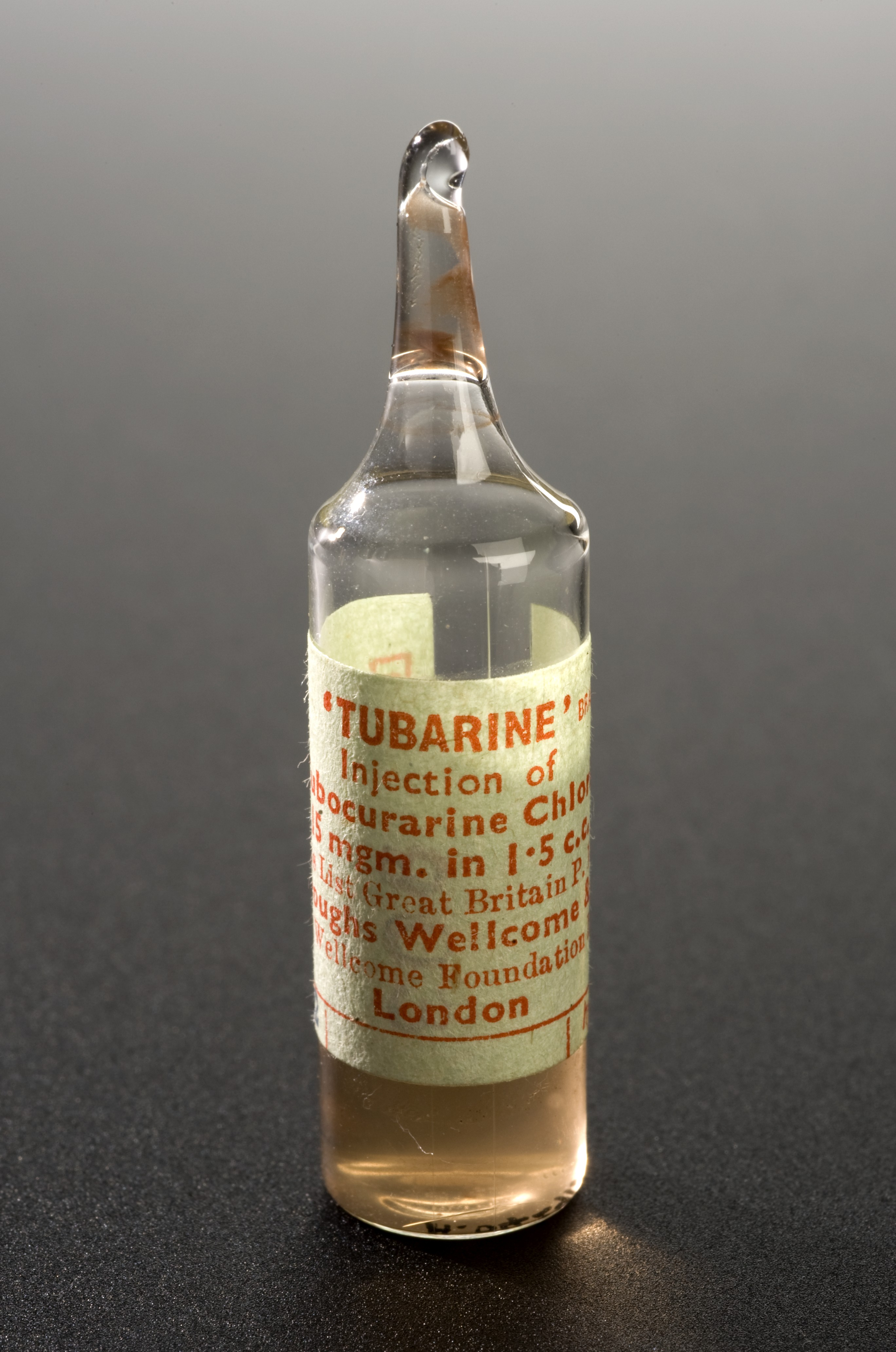
A glass container containing tubocurarine chloride. Tubocurarine was used in ancient times as a poison, but was used in the 20th century as a muscle relaxant.

Over time, different civilizations began to create their own herbal medicinal treatments for wounds depending on the trees, shrubs, or any other type of plants located in their environment. These herbal treatments became the oldest form of wound therapy. It is logically assumed that this may not have been a very safe way of treating humans with wounds due to overdosing or choosing the wrong plants to treat a person until the right one was found. Nevertheless, most of the ancient people who were given the duty of healers through the usage of herbs were well accustomed with which plants from their local flora could be used to help the injured. This knowledge was learned and passed down after healers repeatedly used an herbal remedy for a specific wound with the belief that it promoted healing.

Numerous ancient herbal remedies and poisons now serve as models for modern medicine. For example, curare, which was an ancient South American arrow poison, was used in the 20th century as the muscle relaxant tubocurarine. Tribesmen conducted various observations on the effects of different plant parts, meaning roots, leaves, etc., on specific wounds. They also observed what seasons, time of day, or moon phase would result in a most active plant. The latter however resulted in a minimal influence in modern medicine as compared to plants' parts or seasons of growth.

=== Ancient Egypt ===
The clinical history of the treatment of acute and chronic wounds can also trace its origins to ancient Egypt, and many Egyptian medical papyri have survived which document herbal, surgical and magical remedies for wounds. The Edwin Smith Papyrus, c. 1600 BCE, describes closing wounds with sutures (for wounds of the lip, throat, and shoulder), bandaging, splints, poultices, preventing and curing infection with honey, and stopping bleeding with raw meat. The Ebers Papyrus, c. 1500 BCE, details the use of lint, animal grease, and honey as topical treatments for wounds. The lint provided its natural absorbency, the animal grease provided a barrier to environmental pathogens, and the honey served as an antibiotic agent. The Brugsch Papyrus, c. 1200 BCE, stated that the Egyptians believed that making sure a person's wound stayed closed would help their own spirit not be invaded by external evil spirits.

=== Ancient Greece and Rome ===
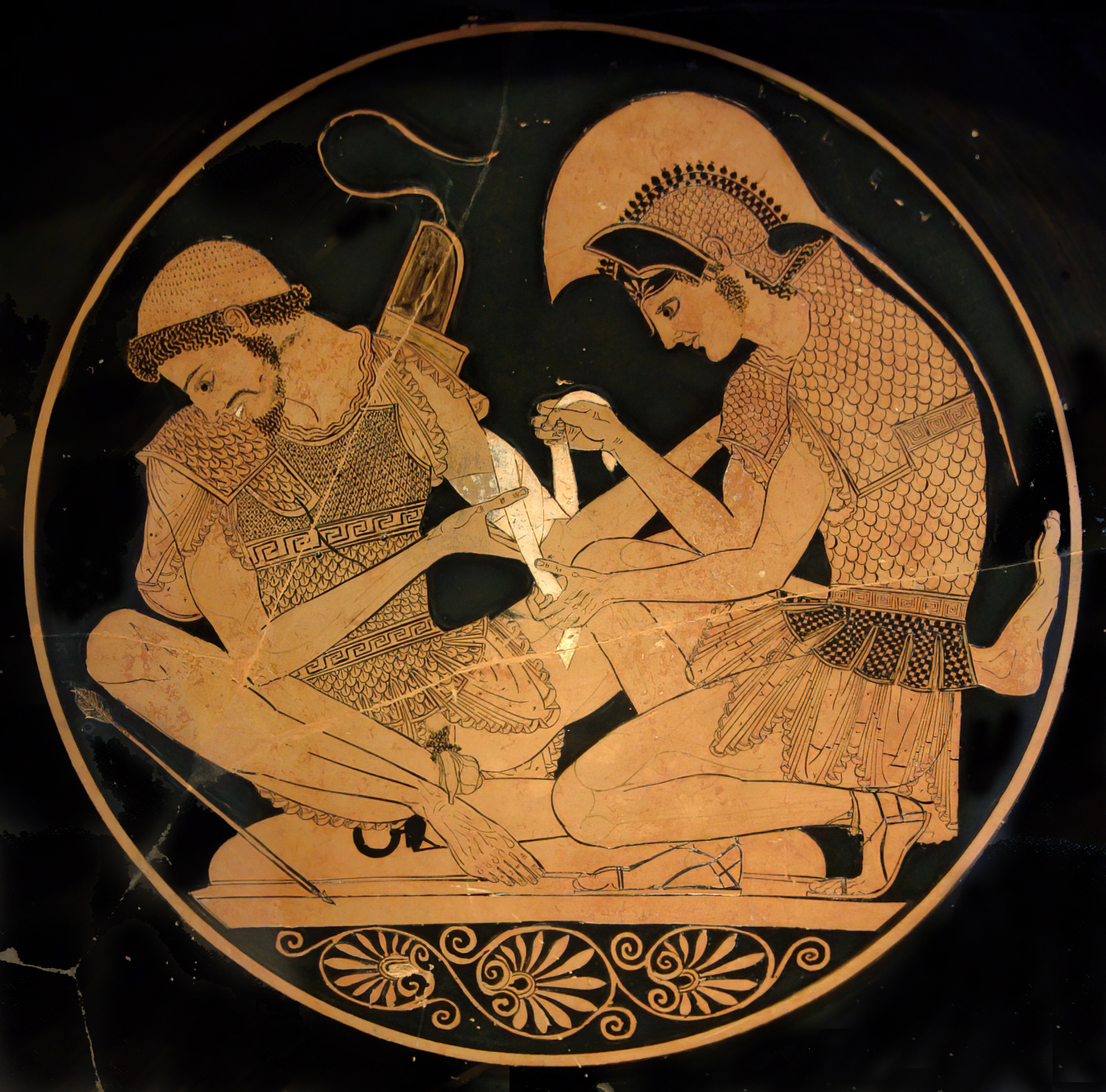
Achilles tending Patroclus wounded by an arrow (Attic red-figure kylix, c. 500 BC)

As tribal healers developed into doctors, it spurred on a primitive pharmaceutical industry that included traders who would travel overseas bringing herbs that would be used for specific wounds. Soon, like most industries, patients began to skip the doctors altogether and purchased the herbs directly from the traders who were also aware of the effects and quantities that should be taken while also informing their "patients" of them. These merchants that supplied people with herbs were known as rhizotomiki, or gatherers of roots, in Ancient Greece. The earliest known list of herbs and remedies was probably written for these herbal merchants. The earliest known to men is the Rhizotomika of Diocles of Carustius, a student of Greek philosopher Aristotle. This book includes the author's observation of the effects of the herbal medicine on specific parts of the human body. This then became the beginning of scientific research on herbal remedies on humans, which has been modified and significantly changed from modern wound remedies.

The Greeks also acknowledged the importance of wound closure, and were the first to differentiate between acute and chronic wounds, calling them "fresh" and "non-healing", respectively. Galen of Pergamum, a Greek surgeon who served Roman gladiators circa 120–201 A.D., made many contributions to the field of wound care. The most important was the acknowledgment of the importance of maintaining wound-site moisture to ensure successful closure of the wound.

=== Ancient China ===
A seminal work of traditional Chinese medicine was the Huangdi neijing (Yellow Emperor's Inner Canon) compiled between the 3rd and 2nd centuries BC (i.e. originating in the Warring States period), which viewed the human body, its organs and tissues through the lens of the metaphysical five phases and yin and yang, and stated a belief in two circulatory channels of qi vital energy. In surgery, Han dynasty era Chinese texts offered practical advice for certain procedures such as clinical lancing of abscesses. The first known physician in China to describe the use anesthesia for patients undergoing surgery was the Eastern Han physician Hua Tuo (d. 208 AD), who utilized his knowledge of Chinese herbology based in the Huangdi neijing to create an ointment that healed surgical wounds within a month. One of his surgical procedures was the removal of a dead fetus from the womb of a woman whom he diagnosed and cured of her ailments.

=== Remedies used in ancient treatments ===
==== Honey ====
Honey was utilized for its antibacterial properties that helped heal infected wounds. Moreover, honey was used as a topical ointment. Other than sugar, honey also contains a variety of trace amounts of many different vitamins and proteins.

==== Alcohol ====
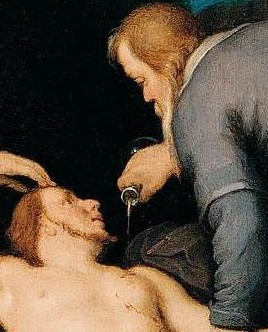
Detail from The Good Samaritan by Cornelis van Haarlem (1627) showing the Samaritan pouring oil and wine on the injured man's wounds

Various types of alcohol were also used in ancient medical practices.

One of the first uses was wine mixed with oil was a common remedy in the ancient world to cleanse wounds and assuage their pain as noted in the context of Alcohol in the Bible.

The Sumerians used beer as an antiseptic along with the dressing of wounds, using up to 19 different types of beer. Other ancient Mesopotamian cultures, including the Sumerians and Akkadians used wine with sesame infusions, which were "purified and pulverized" before application along with the many beers. A medical prescription from Mesopotamia describes a method for healing wounds:

Pound together fur-turpentine, pine-turpentine, tamarisk, daisy, flour of inninnu strain; mix in milk and beer in a small copper pan; spread on skin; bind on him, and he shall recover.

Another peoples to take advantage of the cleansing properties of alcohol were the Greeks. They used wine along with boiled water and vinegar to cleanse wounds. The Greeks, specifically Hippocrates (430–377 BC), were also the first to establish the four cardinal signs of inflammation: redness, swelling, heat and pain. Alcohol is still in use today as a wound cleanser largely as rubbing alcohol. However the side effects can be skin cell death resulting in inflammation and itchiness at the site of application.

== Middle Ages ==
There were limited advances that continued throughout the Middle Ages and the Renaissance, but the most profound advances—both technological and clinical—came with the development of microbiology and cellular pathology in the 19th century.

== 19th century ==
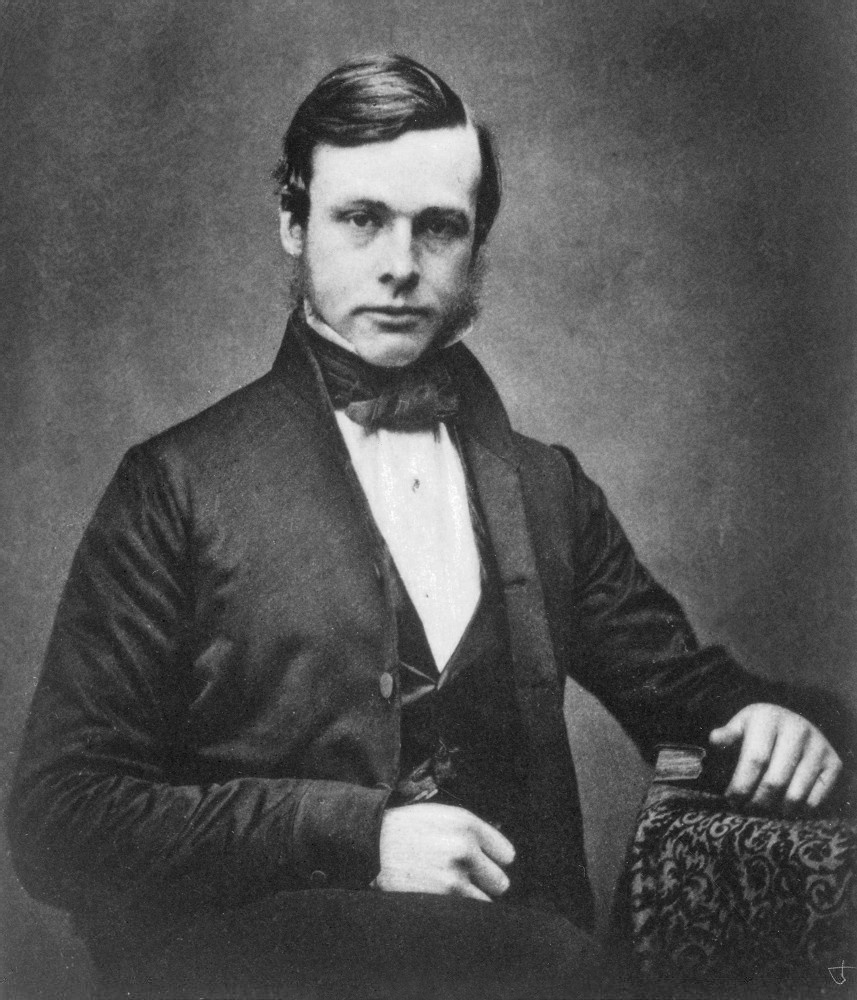
This is a portrait of Joseph Lister, who was the first doctor to begin to sterilize his surgical gauze.

The first advances in wound care in this era began with the work of Ignaz Philipp Semmelweis, a Hungarian obstetrician who discovered how hand washing and cleanliness in general in medical procedures prevents maternal deaths. Semmelweis's work was furthered by an English surgeon, Joseph Lister, who in 1860s began treating his surgical gauze with carbolic acid, known today as phenol, and subsequently dropped his surgical team's mortality rate by 45%. Building on the success of Lister's pretreated surgical gauze, Robert Wood Johnson I, co-founder of Johnson & Johnson, began in the 1890s producing gauze and wound dressings sterilized with dry heat, steam, and pressure. These innovations in wound-site dressings marked the first major steps forward in the field since the advances of the Egyptians and Greeks centuries earlier.

In 1886, Ernst von Bergmann introduced heat sterilization of surgical instruments, which marked the beginning of aseptic surgery and significantly reduced the frequency of infections. Conrad Brunner did extensive research into wound management and experimentation with wound disinfection methods, publishing his comprehensive Erfahrungen und Studien über Wundinfektion und Wundbehandlung in 1898. That same year, Paul Leopold Friedrich introduced wound excision and experimentally showed that excision of open wounds substantially reduced the risk of infection. The next advances would arise from the development of polymer synthetics for wound dressings and the "rediscovery" of moist wound-site care protocols in the mid 20th century.

== Wound-site dressing ==
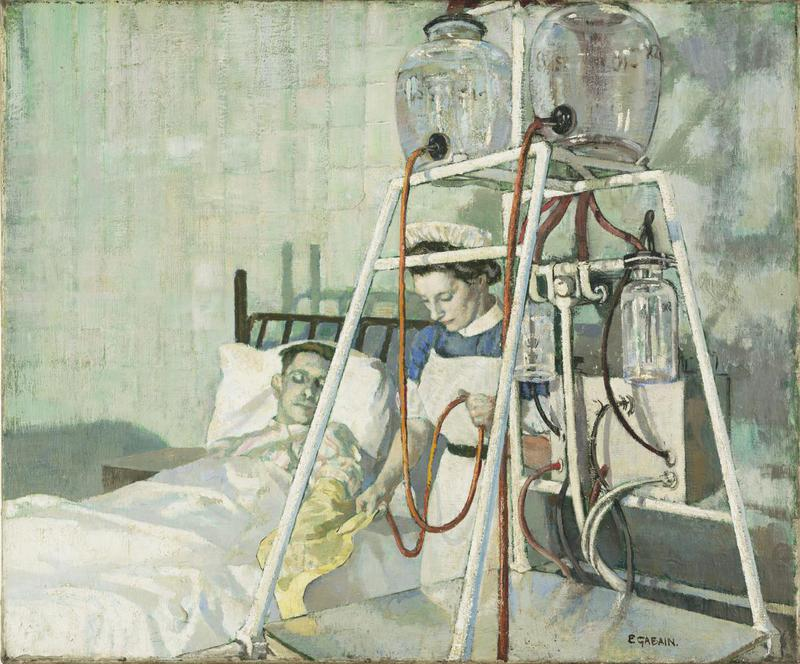
A Bunyan-Stannard Irrigation Envelope for the Treatment of Burns being applied by Sister Roberts in Middlesex Hospital by Ethel Léontine Gabain (1943): A patient being treated for burns with a sleeve that contains a dilute sodium hypochlorite solution for wound care

During World War I, chemist Henry Drysdale Dakin was consulted and invented Dakin's Solution, a mixture of sodium hypochlorite and boric acid, to wash out the traumatic wounds of British soldiers fighting in France.

=== 1950s onward ===
The advent in the 1950s of fibrous synthetics such as nylon, polyethylene, polypropylene, and polyvinyls provided new materials from which researchers and doctors in the field of wound care could explore better protecting of healing wounds and even accelerating the natural wound healing process.

In the 1960s, research and articles by George Winter and Howard Maibach reported on the superior efficacy of moist wound dressings. The adoption of moist wound dressing technique as recommended best wound dressing practice reflected a large advance in approach producing markedly superior clinical outcomes. This dawn of modern wound care treatment initiated a process of improvement in the clinician's ability to bolster wound-site re-epithelialization and healing. The focus on evidence-based best practices and research continues.

In the 1990s, improvements in composite and hybrid polymers expanded the range of materials available for wound dressing. Grafting and biotechnology have produced usable and useful protective covering of actual human skin generated through cloning procedures. These improvements, coupled with the developments in tissue engineering, have given rise to a number of new classes of wound dressings. One of these, "living skin equivalents," is often cited as a misnomer because they lack key components of whole living skin. "Living skin equivalents" may have the potential to serve as cellular platforms for the release of growth factors essential for proper wound healing. Many biologics, skin substitutes, biomembranes and scaffolds have been developed to facilitate wound healing through various mechanisms.

Other recent developments has been the renewed focus on the prominent patient concern of pain. Burn patients and others affected by severe wounds often report pain as the dominant negative impact of the wounds on their lives. Clinical management of the pain associated with chronic wounds has been an emergency wound treatment priority and is now viewed as an integral part of treatment.

=== Modern wound care ===
In modern-day 21st century, medicine has evolved to involve past treatments such as leech therapy, as well as advancing wound prevention and the treatment. A large part of wound care is wound treatment. This involves promoting healing, preventing infections, and getting rid of an already existent infection. Deciding on a treatment depends on the type of wound that a person has sustained. Varying from infections to burns, wound care is a priority in saving the limb, extremity, or life of a person. In a hospital or medical care setting, more severe wounds like diabetic ulcers, decubitus ulcers, and burns require sterile or clean (depending on the severity of the wound) dressings and wound care. The types of wound dressing include: dry dressings, wet-to-dry dressings, chemical-impregnated dressings, foam dressings, alginate dressings, hydrofiber dressings, transparent film dressings, hydrogel dressings, and hydrocolloid dressings. All of the listed dressing types require different materials to complete the dressing.

- Dry dressings: these dressings are typically composed of a gauze material and used for wounds with a small amount of drainage. These dressings are good for keeping the wound covered after cleaning and to promote healing as well as taking out small amounts of infection.
- Wet-to-dry dressings: Although some medical facilities are stepping away from these types of dressings, they are used mostly for post-surgical wound care as well as debridement of wounds. These dressings take out necrotic areas as well as infections. In this type of wound dressing, gauze is soaked in saline, placed lightly inside of the wound, and covered with a dry dressing. Once the gauze dries, it can be removed. It dries onto the infection or necrotic areas to remove them. These dressings are being replaced by Wound-Vacs, which are attached to a dressing directly onto the wound, and lightly but continuously, pull and suck exudate and fluids from the wound.
- Chemical-impregnated dressings: these are provided by manufacturers and they contain chemicals and agents that promote the healing process. Some of these dressings come in sheets and require secondary dressings.
- Foam dressings: dressings that require additional padding utilize foam pads to help absorb and provide a moist healing environment. They also act as a shield to the wound and prevent any damage from friction or pressure. They can be tricky when applying and removing due to the surrounding skin.
- Alginate dressings: these dressings are composed of calcium, sodium salts and also provide a moist environment for the healing process. They are better used with a larger wound such as ulcers or donor sites.
- Hydro-fiber dressings: these dressings are similar to alginate dressings when it comes to absorbing characteristics, but they do not affect hemostasis. They are composed in sheets which contain polymer carboxymethylcellulose and can be cut according to wound size and severity. However, when using these dressings, a secondary dressing is almost always required.
- Transparent film dressings: this specific type of dressing is more like a plastic covering for the wound. It allows oxygen to reach it and help heal but does not absorb any fluids. Transparent film dressings are used primarily on dry wounds.
- Hydrogel dressings: this type of dressing is more directed towards infected areas and those in need of a moist environment to heal properly. It helps promote the body's own natural functions of removing necrotic tissue. It is advised not to be used on dry wounds.
- Hydrocolloid dressings: unlike transparent film dressings, hydrocolloid dressings do not allow oxygen to reach the wound. It is a wet-to-dry technique but is not recommended for infected areas. This type of dressing can last up to 7 days with a close eye and must be removed with care.
- Biologically based dressings: Integra LifeSciences’ artificial skin is placed on a wound where burned or scarred skin has been removed. Composed of two-layers, an under layer made of collagen from cows and glycosaminoglycan from shark cartilage, and an outer silicone layer, the membrane provides scaffolding to regrow a new layer of dermis.

=== Alternative treatments for wounds: leeches and maggots ===
Medical leeches were cleared as a medical device in 2004 after being an indispensable tool in the 19th century and even in use in the Middle Ages. This unique use of creatures is utilized in many surgeries today. Leeches have the ability to assist with compromised tissue with the components of their saliva. Their saliva contains a local anesthetic, thrombin inhibitor, antibiotic properties and a histamine-like vasodilator. These capabilities help in surgeries such as transplants, skin grafts, and even reconstructive surgeries. The leeches help localize the wound and help produce blood flow. This is helpful in operations where blood clots occur and they help dilate the blood vessels.

Baron Dominique Jean Larrey, surgeon-in-chief of Napoleon's Grande Armée pioneered the use of maggots to prevent infection in wounds. They were also used by military medical aids during World War II. They worked as biomedical debriding agents by ingesting bacteria and breaking them down within their intestines. Maggots give off an enzyme that disinfects wounds and promotes healing and this is why they became the first organism in the United States that were used as a medical device in January 2004.

== See also ==
- Wound bed preparation

== Sources ==
- Ovington LG (October 2002). "The evolution of wound management: ancient origins and advances of the past 20 years". Home Healthc Nurse. 20 (10): 652–6. doi:10.1097/00004045-200210000-00009. PMID 12394337.
- Sipos P, Gyõry H, Hagymási K, Ondrejka P, Blázovics A (February 2004). "Special wound healing methods used in ancient egypt and the mythological background". World J Surg. 28 (2): 211–6. doi:10.1007/s00268-003-7073-x. PMID 14708054. S2CID 1210892.
- "Dressing and Bandage Types." Wound Care. N.p., n.d. Web. 23 Nov. 2015.
