= Tegaderm =

Type of transparent medical dressing

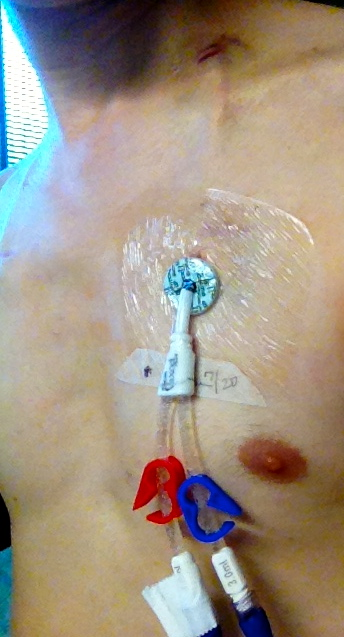
A Hickman line held fast by Tegaderm

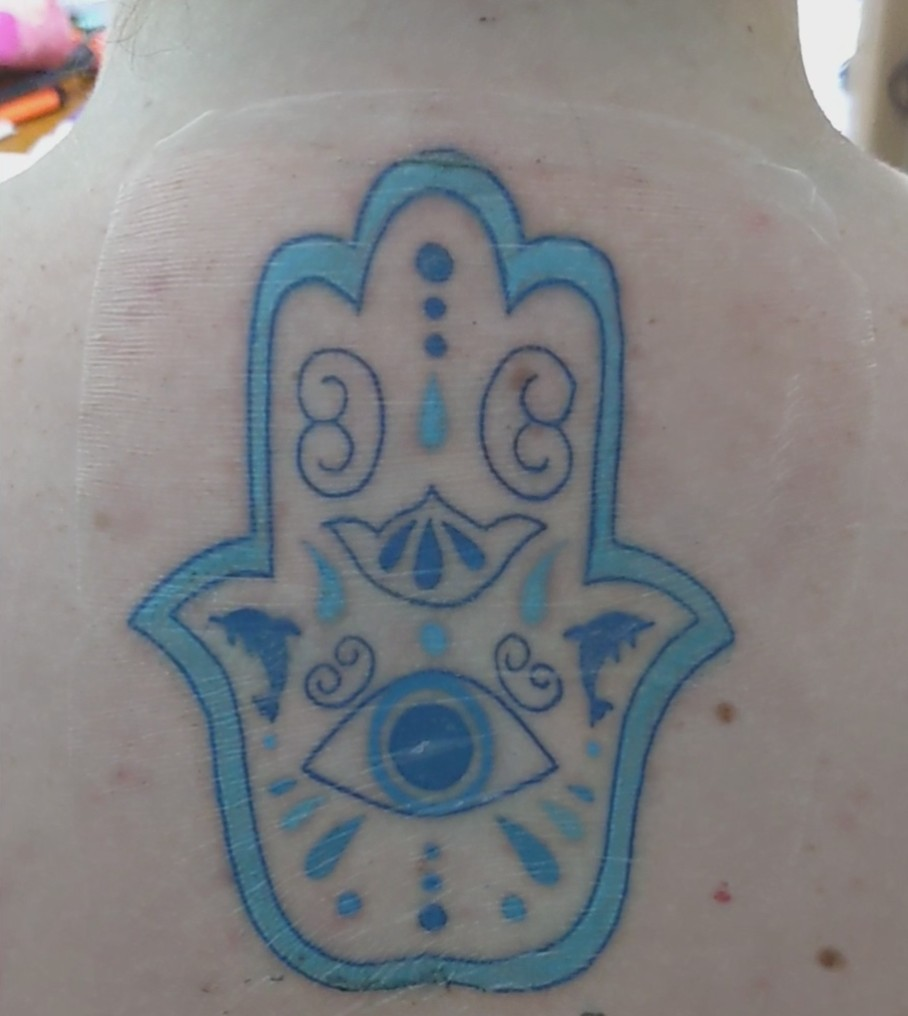
Tegaderm is sometimes used to cover tattoos while they heal.

Tegaderm is a transparent medical dressing manufactured by 3M. Tegaderm transparent dressings can be used to cover and protect wounds and catheter sites.

Advantages of Tegaderm include its breathability and conformation to the skin such that it adheres in places such as the fingers and toes.

Tegaderm may also be used in "buddy strapping" of fingers. Buddy-strapping is a method of finger splinting that allows protected active movement in situations such as stable phalangeal fractures, undisplaced stable metacarpal fractures and ligamentous interphalangeal joint injuries. Tegaderm is simple for patients to self-apply. A full range of movement is possible with full support provided throughout.

Tegaderm is also a popular means of protecting a newly received tattoo.

The name Tegaderm comes from the Latin prefix "tega" meaning 'cover' and the Greek root "derm" meaning 'skin'.

== See also ==
- Hydrocolloid dressing
