= Immobilized whole cell =

The immobilized whole cell system is an alternative to enzyme immobilization. Unlike enzyme immobilization, where the enzyme is attached to a solid support (such as calcium alginate or activated PVA or activated PEI), in immobilized whole cell systems, the target cell is immobilized. Such methods may be implemented when the enzymes required are difficult or expensive to extract, an example being intracellular enzymes. Also, if a series of enzymes are required in the reaction; whole cell immobilization may be used for convenience. This is only done on a commercial basis when the need for the product is more justified.

Multiple enzymes may be introduced into the reaction, thus eliminating the need for immobilization of multiple enzymes. Furthermore, intracellular enzymes need not be extracted prior to the reaction; they may be used directly. However, some enzymes may be used for the metabolic needs of the cell, leading to reduced yield of the cell.

== See also ==
- Immobilized enzyme
