= Cross-linked enzyme aggregate =

In biochemistry, a cross-linked enzyme aggregate is an immobilized enzyme prepared via cross-linking of the physical enzyme aggregates with a difunctional cross-linker. They can be used as stereoselective industrial biocatalysts.

== Background ==
Enzymes are proteins that catalyze (i.e. accelerate) chemical reactions. They are natural catalysts and are ubiquitous, in plants, animals and microorganisms where they catalyze processes that are vital to living organisms. They are intimately involved in numerous biotechnological processes, such as cheese making, beer brewing and winemaking, that date back to the dawn of civilization. Recent advances in biotechnology, particularly in genetic and protein engineering, and genetics have provided the basis for the efficient development of enzymes with improved properties for established applications and novel, tailor-made enzymes for completely new applications where enzymes were not previously used.

Today, enzymes are widely applied in many different industries and the number of applications continues to increase. Examples include food (baking, dairy products, starch conversion) and beverage (beer, wine, fruit and vegetable juices) processing, animal feed, textiles, pulp and paper, detergents, biosensors, cosmetics, health care and nutrition, waste water treatment, pharmaceutical and chemical manufacture and, more recently, biofuels such as biodiesel. The main driver for the widespread application of enzymes is their small environmental footprint.

Many traditional chemical conversions used in various industries suffer from inherent drawbacks from both an economic and environmental viewpoint. Non-specific reactions can afford low product yields, copious amounts of waste and impure products. The need for elevated temperatures and pressures leads to high energy consumption and high capital investment costs. Disposal of unwanted by-products may be difficult and/or expensive and hazardous solvents may be required. In stark contrast, enzymatic reactions are performed under mild conditions of temperature and pressure, in water as solvent, and exhibit very high rates and are often highly specific. Moreover, they are produced from renewable raw materials and are biodegradable. In addition, the mild operating conditions of enzymatic processes mean that they can be performed in relatively simple equipment and are easy to control. In short, they reduce the environmental footprint of manufacturing by reducing the consumption of energy and chemicals and concomitant generation of waste.

In the production of fine chemicals, flavors and fragrances, agrochemicals and pharmaceuticals an important benefit of enzymes is the high degree of chemoselectivity, regioselectivity and enantioselectivity which they exhibit. Particularly, their ability to catalyze the formation of products in high enantiopurity, by an exquisite stereochemical control, is of the utmost importance in these industries.

Notwithstanding all these desirable characteristic features of enzymes, their widespread industrial application is often hampered by their lack of long term operational stability and shelf-storage life, as well as by their cumbersome recovery and re-use. These drawbacks can be generally overcome by enzyme immobilization. A major present challenge in industrial biocatalysis is the development of stable, robust and preferably insoluble biocatalysts.

== Immobilization ==
See Immobilized enzyme for more information.

There are several reasons for immobilizing an enzyme. In addition to more convenient handling of the enzyme, it provides for its facile separation from the product, thereby minimizing or eliminating protein contamination of the product. Immobilization also facilitates the efficient recovery and re-use of costly enzymes, in many applications a conditio sine qua non for economic viability, and enables their use in continuous, fixed-bed operation. A further benefit is often enhanced stability, under both storage and operational conditions, e.g. towards denaturation by heat or organic solvents or by autolysis. Enzymes are rather delicate molecules that can easily lose their unique three-dimensional structure, essential for their activity, by denaturation (unfolding). Improved enzyme performance via enhanced stability, over a broad pH and temperature range as well as tolerance towards organic solvents, coupled with repeated re-use is reflected in higher catalyst productivities (kg product/kg enzyme) which, in turn, determine the enzyme costs per kg product.

Basically, three traditional methods of enzyme immobilization can be distinguished: binding to a support(carrier), entrapment (encapsulation) and cross-linking. Support binding can be physical, ionic, or covalent in nature. However, physical bonding is generally too weak to keep the enzyme fixed to the carrier under industrial conditions of high reactant and product concentrations and high ionic strength. The support can be a synthetic resin, a biopolymer or an inorganic polymer such as (mesoporous) silica or a zeolite. Entrapment involves inclusion of an enzyme in a polymer network (gel lattice) such as an organic polymer or a silica sol-gel, or a membrane device such as a hollow fiber or a microcapsule. Entrapment requires the synthesis of the polymeric network in the presence of the enzyme. The third category involves cross-linking of enzyme aggregates or crystals, using a bifunctional reagent, to prepare carrier-free macroparticles.

The use of a carrier inevitably leads to ‘dilution of activity’, owing to the introduction of a large portion of non-catalytic ballast, ranging from 90% to >99%, which results in lower space-time yields and productivities. Moreover, immobilization of an enzyme on a carrier often leads to a substantial loss of activity, especially at high enzyme loadings. Consequently, there is an increasing interest in carrier-free immobilized enzymes, such as cross-linked enzyme crystals (CLECs) and cross-linked enzyme aggregates (CLEAs) that offer the advantages of highly concentrated enzyme activity combined with high stability and low production costs owing to the exclusion of an additional (expensive) carrier.

== Cross-Linked Enzyme Aggregates (CLEAs) ==
The use of cross-linked enzyme crystals (CLECs) as industrial biocatalysts was pioneered by Altus Biologics in the 1990s. CLECs proved to be significantly more stable to denaturation by heat, organic solvents and proteolysis than the corresponding soluble enzyme or lyophilized (freeze-dried) powder. CLECs are robust, highly active immobilized enzymes of controllable particle size, varying from 1 to 100 micrometer. Their operational stability and ease of recycling, coupled with their high catalyst and volumetric productivities, renders them ideally suited for industrial biotransformations.

However, CLECs have an inherent disadvantage: enzyme crystallization is a laborious procedure requiring enzyme of high purity, which translates to prohibitively high costs. The more recently developed cross-linked enzyme aggregates (CLEAs), on the other hand, are produced by simple precipitation of the enzyme from aqueous solution, as physical aggregates of protein molecules, by the addition of salts, or water miscible organic solvents or non-ionic polymers. The physical aggregates are held together by covalent bonding without perturbation of their tertiary structure, that is without denaturation. Subsequent cross-linking of these physical aggregates renders them permanently insoluble while maintaining their pre-organized superstructure, and, hence their catalytic activity. This discovery led to the development of a new family of immobilized enzymes: cross-linked enzyme aggregates (CLEAs). Since precipitation from an aqueous medium, by addition of ammonium sulfate or polyethylene glycol, is often used to purify enzymes, the CLEA methodology essentially combines purification and immobilization into a single unit operation that does not require a highly pure enzyme. It could be used, for example, for the direct isolation of an enzyme, in a purified and immobilized form suitable for performing biotransformations, from a crude fermentation broth.

CLEAs are very attractive biocatalysts, owing to their facile, inexpensive and effective production method. They can readily be reused and exhibit improved stability and performance. The methodology is applicable to essentially any enzyme, including cofactor dependent oxidoreductases. Application to penicillin acylase used in antibiotic synthesis showed large improvements over other type of biocatalysts.

The potential applications of CLEAs are numerous and include:

1. Synthesis of pharmaceuticals, flavors and fragrances, agrochemicals, nutraceuticals, fine chemicals, bulk monomers and biofuels.
2. Animal feed, e.g. phytase for utilization of organically bound phosphate by pigs and poultry.
3. Food and beverage processing, e.g. lipases in cheese manufacture and laccase in wine clarification.
4. Cosmetics, e.g. in skin care products
5. Oils and fats processing, e.g. in biolubricants, bioemulsifiers, bio-derived emollients.
6. Carbohydrate processing, e.g. laccase in carbohydrate oxidations.
7. Pulp and paper, e.g. in pulp bleaching.
8. Detergents, e.g. proteases, amylases and lipases for removal of protein, carbohydrate and fat stains.
9. Waste water treatment, e.g. for removal of phenols, dyes, and endocrine disrupters.
10. Biosensors/diagnostics, e.g. glucose oxidase and cholesterol oxidase biosensors.
11. Delivery of proteins as therapeutic agents or nutritional/digestive supplements e.g. beta-galactosidase for digestive hydrolysis of lactose in dairy products to alleviate the symptoms of lactose intolerance.
