= Immobilized enzyme =

Enzyme attached to an inert material

An immobilized enzyme is an enzyme, with restricted mobility, attached to an inert, insoluble material—such as calcium alginate (produced by reacting a mixture of sodium alginate solution and enzyme solution with calcium chloride). This can provide increased resistance to changes in conditions such as pH or temperature. It also lets enzymes be held in place throughout the reaction, following which they are easily separated from the products and may be used again - a far more efficient process and so is widely used in industry for enzyme catalysed reactions. An alternative to enzyme immobilization is whole cell immobilization. Immobilized enzymes are easily to be handled, simply separated from their products, and can be reused.

Enzymes are bio-catalysts which play an essential role in the enhancement of chemical reactions in cells without being persistently modified, wasted, nor resulting in the loss of equilibrium of chemical reactions. Although the characteristics of enzymes are extremely unique, their utility in the industry is limited due to the lack of re-usability, stability, and high-cost of production.

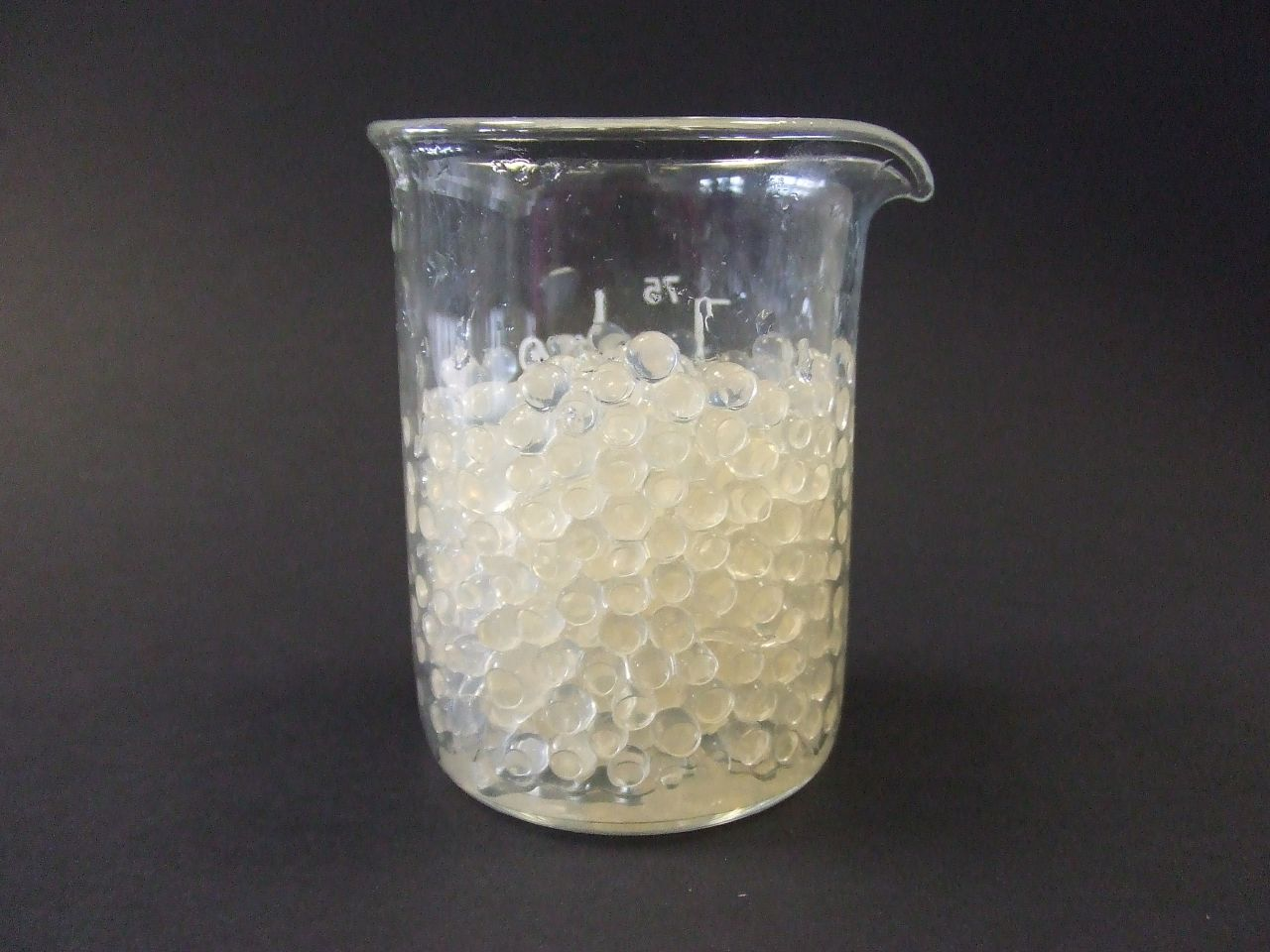
Enzymes immobilised in beads of alginate gel

== History ==
The first synthetic immobilized enzyme was made in the 1950s, performed by the inclusion of enzyme into polymeric matrices or binding onto carrier substances. Also cross-linking procedure was applied by cross-linking of protein alone or along with the addition of inert materials. Over the last decade various immobilization methods have been developed. Binding the enzyme to previously synthesized carrier materials for example is the mostly preferred method so far. Newly, the procedure of cross-linking of crystals of enzyme is also considered as an exciting substitute. Utilization rate of immobilized enzymes is growing constantly.

== Considerations ==
Before performing any kind of immobilization techniques, some factors should be in mind. It is necessary to understand the chemical and physical effects on an enzyme following immobilization. Enzyme stability and kinetic characteristics can be altered due to changes in the microenvironment conditions of the enzyme after entrapment, support material attachment, or products of enzymatic actions for instance. Additionally, it is important to consider maintaining the tertiary structure of an enzyme prior to immobilizing to have a functional enzyme. Similarly, another crucial site for the functionality of an enzyme is the active-site, which should also be maintained while enzyme is being attached to a surface for immobilization, it is a must to have a selective method for the attachment of surface/material to not end up with an immobilized, but dysfunctional enzyme. Consequently, there are three foundational factors to be thought of for the production of functional immobilized enzymes: immobilization supports selection, conditions and methods of immobilization.

=== Support selection ===
For a support material to be ideal, it must be hydrophilic, inert towards enzymes, biocompatible, microbial attack and compression resistant, and must be affordable. Support materials can be organic or inorganic, synthetic or natural (depending on the composition), since they are biomaterial types at the end. There is no universal type of a support material to be used for the immobilization of all enzymes. However, there are some commonly used supports such as silica-based carriers, acrylic resins, synthetic polymers, active membranes and exchange resins. One of the hardest processes before the immobilization process itself, is the selection of support material since it relies on the enzyme type, reaction of media, safety policy of hydrodynamic and reaction conditions. As different types of support give different physical and chemical characteristics and properties, which would effect enzyme function, such as: Hydrophilicity/hydrophobicity, surface chemistry, and pore size.

== Methods ==
Enzymes can be immobilized by physical, or chemical methods including:

=== Physical ===
==== Adsorption ====
- A straightforward method for reversible immobilization, involving the enzymes being adsorbed or attached physically onto a support substance. Adsorption can take place through weak non-specific forces, such as van der waals, hydrogen bonds, and hydrophobic interactions, whereas in ionic bonding the enzymes are bound through salt linkages.
- Adsorption on glass, alginate beads or matrix: Enzyme is attached to the outside of an inert material. In general, this method is the slowest among those listed here. As adsorption is not a chemical reaction, the active site of the immobilized enzyme may be blocked by the matrix or bead, greatly reducing the activity of the enzyme.

==== Entrapment ====
- This is an irreversible physical immobilization technique which can be considered as a physical restriction of enzyme in a specified area/space. It can be used for raising mechanical stability and can be also used for the reduction of leaching events of enzymes. Since the enzyme in this process does not interact chemically with the polymer/ material of the support fibers/lattice, it remains protected from denaturation with time.
- Basically, the enzyme is trapped in insoluble beads or microspheres, such as calcium alginate beads. However, these insoluble substances hinder the arrival of the substrate, and the exit of products.

=== Chemical ===
==== Cross-linking ====
- Cross-linkage: another irreversible method that does not require a support material for the attachment of enzyme molecules. In this technique, the molecules of enzymes are covalently bonded to each other to create a matrix consisting of almost only enzyme. The reaction ensures that the binding site does not cover the enzyme's active site, the activity of the enzyme is only affected by immobility. However, the inflexibility of the covalent bonds precludes the self-healing properties exhibited by chemo-adsorbed self-assembled monolayers. Use of a spacer molecule like poly(ethylene glycol) helps in the reduction of steric hindrance by the substrate in this case.

==== Covalent bonding ====
- The enzyme is bound covalently to an insoluble support (such as silica gel or macroporous polymer beads with epoxide groups). This approach provides the strongest enzyme/support interaction, and so the lowest protein leakage during catalysis.
- The activity of the enzyme being covalently bound is dependent on several factors including: shape, and size of carrier material, coupling method type, the composition and coupling special conditions of carrier material.

Affinity-tag binding: is an immobilization method combining physical, and chemical methods where enzymes may be immobilized to a surface, e.g. in a porous material, using non-covalent or covalent Protein tags. This technology has been established for protein purification purposes. This technique is the generally applicable, and can be performed without prior enzyme purification with a pure preparation as the result. Porous glass and derivatives thereof are used, where the porous surface can be adapted in terms of hydrophobicity to suit the enzyme in question.

== Random versus site-directed ==
Numerous enzymes of biotechnological importance have been immobilized on various supports (inorganic, organic, composite and nanomaterials) via random multipoint attachment. However, immobilization via random chemical modification results in a heterogeneous protein population where more than one side chains (amino, carboxyl, thiol etc) present in proteins are linked with the support with potential reduction in activity due to restriction of substrate access to the active site.

In contrast, in site-directed enzyme immobilization, the support can be linked to a single specific amino acid (generally N- or C-termini) in a protein molecule away from the active-site. This way maximal enzyme activity is retained due to the free access of the substrate to the active-site. These strategies are mainly chemical but may additionally require genetic and enzymatic methods to generate functional groups (that are absent in protein) on the support and enzyme.

The choice of SDCM method depends on many factors, such as the type of enzyme (less stable psychrophilic, or more stable thermophilic homologue), pH stability of enzyme, the availability of N- or C-termini to the reagent, non-interference of the enzyme terminus with the enzyme activity, type of catalytic amino acid residue, the availability, price and the ease of preparation of reagents. For example, the generation of complementary clickable functionalities (alkyne and azide) on the support and enzyme is one of the most convenient way for immobilizing enzymes via site-directed chemical modification.

== Substrate immobilization ==
Another widely used application of the immobilization approach together with enzymes has been the enzymatic reactions on immobilized substrates. This approach facilitates the analysis of enzyme activities and mimics the performance of enzymes on e.g. cell walls.

== Commercial use ==
Immobilized enzymes have important application uses as they reduce costs and improve the outcome of the reaction they catalyze. Advantages include:

Convenience
Minuscule amounts of protein dissolve in the reaction, so workup can be much easier. Upon completion, reaction mixtures typically contain only solvent and reaction products.
Economy
The immobilized enzyme is easily removed from the reaction making it easy to recycle the biocatalyst. This is particularly useful in processes such as the production of Lactose Free Milk, as the milk can be drained from a container leaving the enzyme (Lactase) inside ready for the next batch.
Stability
Immobilized enzymes typically have greater thermal and operational stability than the soluble form of the enzyme.

In the past, biological washing powders and detergents contained many proteases and lipases that broke down dirt. However, when the cleaning products contacted human skin, they created allergic reactions. This is why immobilization of enzymes is important, for many application fields.

Immobilized enzymes are used in various applications including: food, chemical, pharmaceutical, and medical industry. In the food industry for example, Immobilized enzymes are used for the manufacturing of several types of zero-calorie sweetners, Allulose for instance is an epimer of fructose, which is different structurally, resulting in it not being absorbable by human bodies when ingested. Another example of immobilized-enzyme-based sweetners include: Tagatose (immobilized β-galactosidase).

In the chemical (cosmetics) industry as well, immobilized enzymes are used for the production of emollient esters by utilizing immobilized CalB enzyme. The first company to use such method is Evonik company in 2000. The enzyme Lipase-CalB in its immobilized state is actually used in other pharmaceutical applications for the production of Odanacatib, and Sofosbuvir.
