= Alginate dressing =

Natural wound dressing

An alginate dressing is a natural wound dressing derived from carbohydrate sources released by clinical bacterial species, in the same manner as biofilm formation. These types of dressings are best used on wounds that have a large amount of exudate. They may be used on full-thickness burns, surgical wounds, split-thickness graft donor sites, Mohs surgery defects, refractory decubiti, and chronic ulcers. They can also be applied onto dry wounds after normal saline is first applied to the site of application.

Alginate dressings are produced from the calcium and sodium salts of alginic acid, a polysaccharide comprising mannuronic and guluronic acid units. Alginate is initially extracted from the cell wall of brown seaweeds. Alginate dressings can be in the form of freeze-dried, porous (foam) sheets or flexible fibres. Flexible fibres are used to treat cavity wounds. The alginate will form a gel in contact with the exudates of the wound and give it a strong absorbent power.

There is no evidence of superior effectiveness in those with diabetic foot ulcers.

== Properties of alginate dressings ==
The gelling properties of alginates are attributed to the presence of calcium ions that help form a slow degradeable cross-linked polymer gel. Once in contact with an exuding wound, an ion-exchange reaction takes place between the calcium ions in the dressing and sodium ions in serum or wound fluid. When a significant proportion of the calcium ions on the fibre have been replaced by sodium, the fibre swells and partially dissolves forming a gel-like mass.

The gel formed is highly hydrophilic, which limits wound secretions and minimizes bacterial contamination.

The hydrophilic gel is formed from the initial contact between the sodium ions in wound exudate and calcium ions in alginate. As the gel forms it conforms to the shape of the wound. This is why alginate dressings are good for irregular shaped and wounds that have deep cavities.

Alginates rich in mannuronate form soft gels while those rich in guluronic acid form firmer gels with a higher absorbency of the exudates.

=== Wound healing properties ===
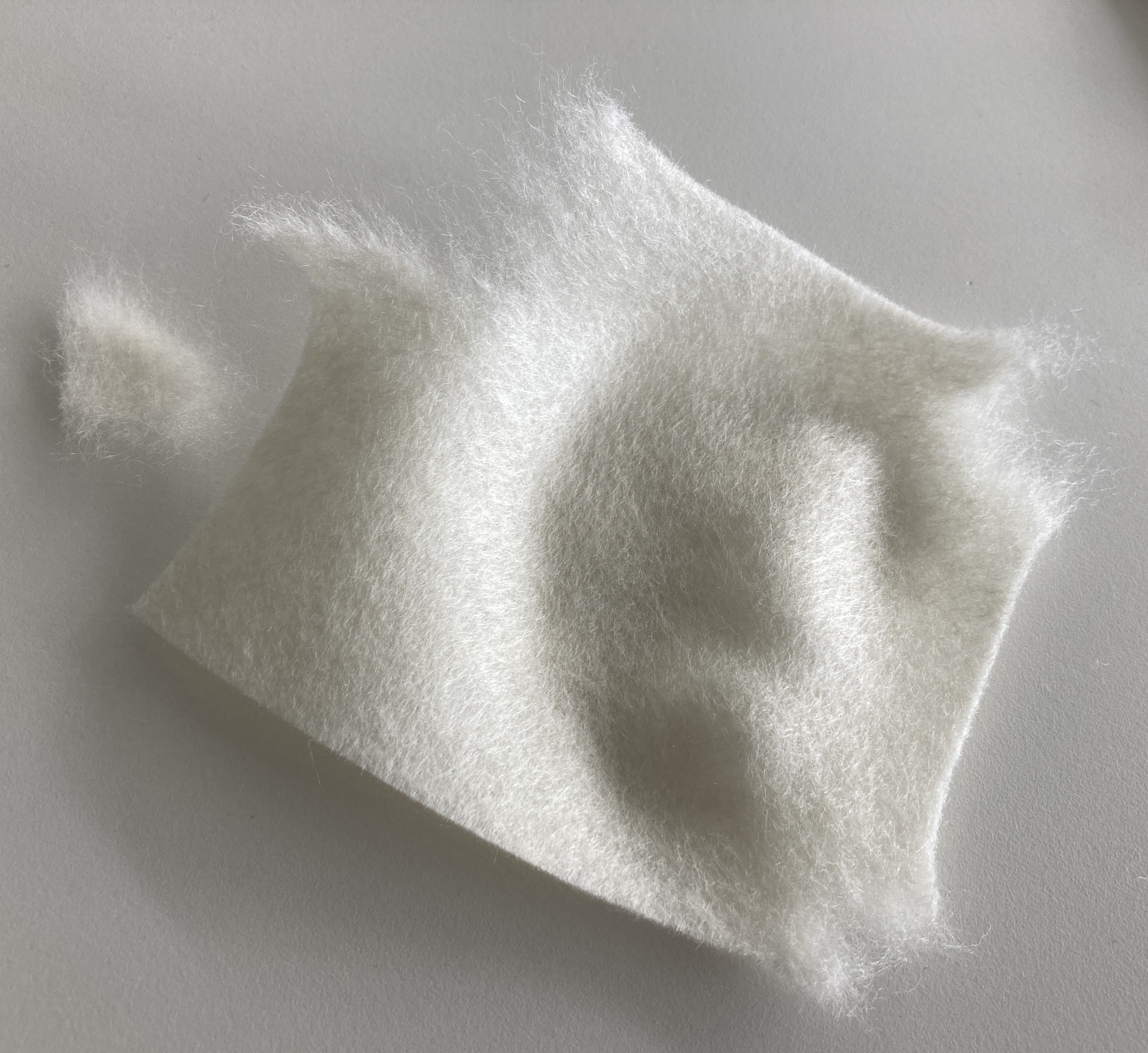
Alginate dressing

- Calcium alginate dressings may help the production of mouse fibroblasts and in vitro, of human fibroblasts. Fibroblasts are known to be involved in the regeneration and healing of the tissues.
- It has been shown that calcium alginate activates human macrophages to produce TNFα (Tumor Necrosis Factor α) which is involved in the inflammatory signals and consequently wound healing process.
- Moreover, the clotting mechanisms during the first stage of wound healing may be improved by calcium alginate.
- A comparative study of hydrocolloid dressings and alginates showed that alginates gels remain on the wound for a longer period than hydrocolloids.
- The early use of alginates as haemostats and wound dressings and their apparent lack of toxicity are discussed.

== Uses ==
Alginate dressings are useful for moderate to heavily exuding wounds. In the form of fibres trapped in a wound, alginate is readily biodegradable and can be rinsed away with saline irrigation. Subsequent removal therefore, does not destroy granulation tissue, making dressing change virtually painless. The ease of biodegradation is exploited in making alginate sutures used in surgical wound closures.

Since alginate dressings require moisture to function effectively, they cannot be used for dry wounds and those covered with hard necrotic tissue.

This is because it could dehydrate the wound, delaying healing and this is their major disadvantage.

== See also ==
- Dressing (medical)
- List of cutaneous conditions
