= Hydrocolloid dressing =

Type of self-adhesive pad for wounds

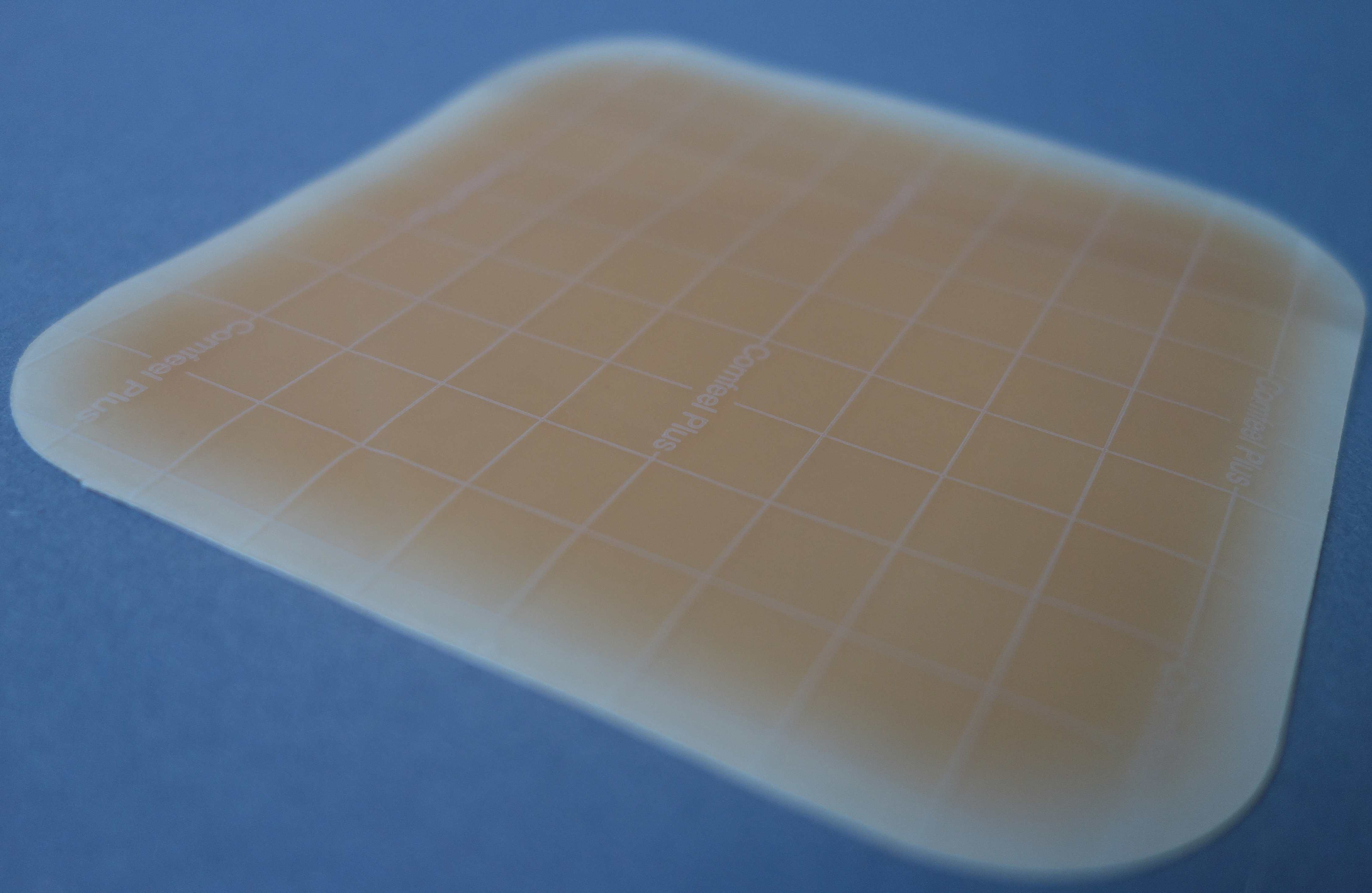
A large hydrocolloid dressing

A hydrocolloid dressing is a medical dressing for superficial open wounds. Such a bandage is biodegradable, and breathable; depending on the dressing selected, it may also adhere to the skin so that no separate taping is needed.

The active (wound-side) surface of the dressing is coated with a cross-linked dispersion of gelatin, pectin, and carboxymethyl cellulose together with other polymers, elastomers, and/or adhesives to form a flexible, thin wafer or film; the outer side is typically a polyurethane tape or foam. In contact with wound exudate, the polysaccharides and other polymers absorb water and swell, forming a gel. The gel may be designed to drain, or to remain within the structure of the adhesive matrix.

Depending on manufacturer, the dressings are available in transparent, translucent, or opaque varieties. Certain brands will develop a wider opaque area when saturated with exudate, which is sometimes a suggested indicator of when to replace them.

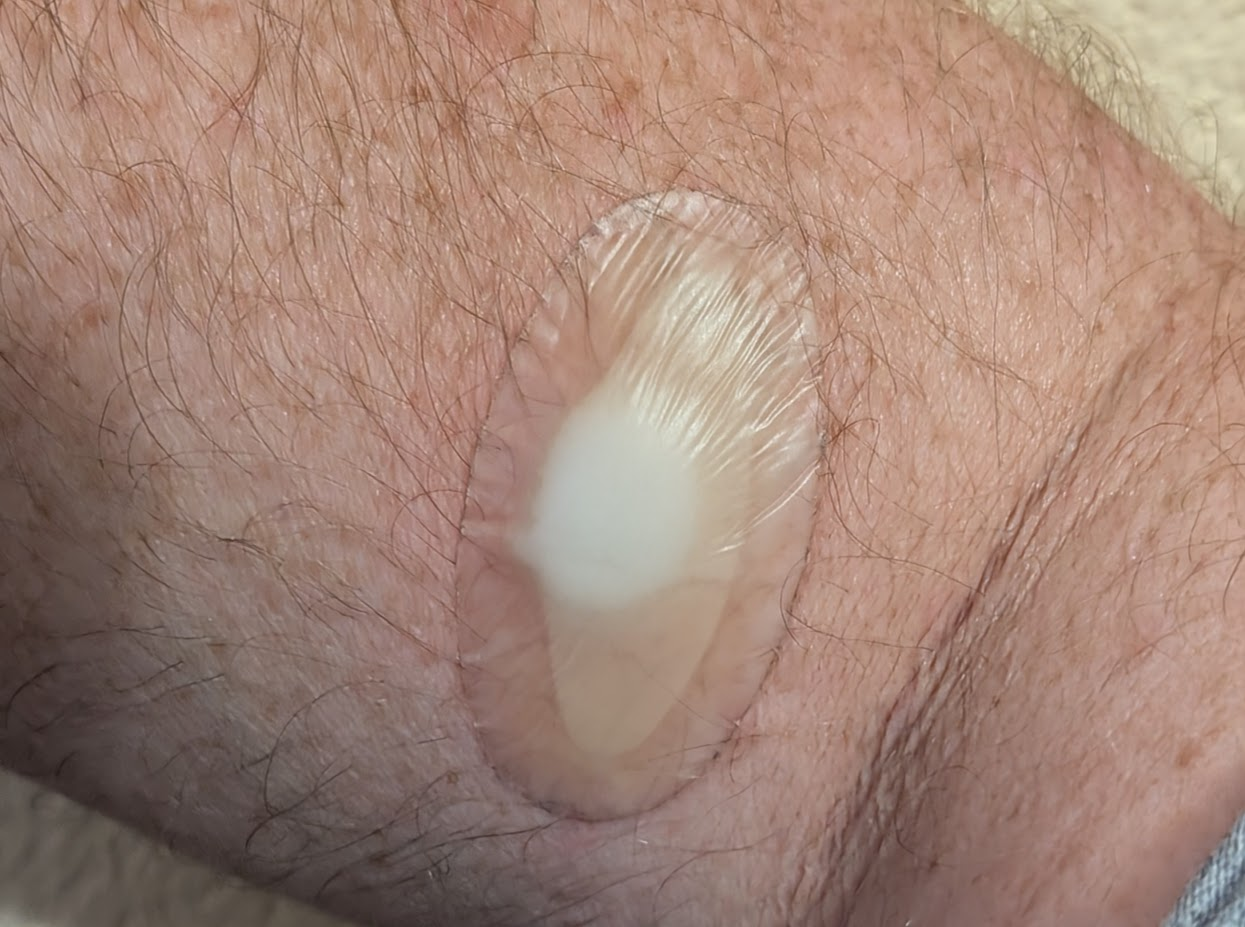
A hydrocolloid bandage has been applied to the ventral surface of the right forearm of a Caucasian adult. The characteristic gel "bubble" covering wound exudate is plainly visible. This bandage has been in place for more than 48 hours.

The moist conditions produced under the dressing are intended to promote wound healing, including fibrinolysis and angiogenesis, without causing softening and breakdown of tissue. Most hydrocolloid dressings are water-resistant, allowing gentle washing and bathing.

== Uses ==
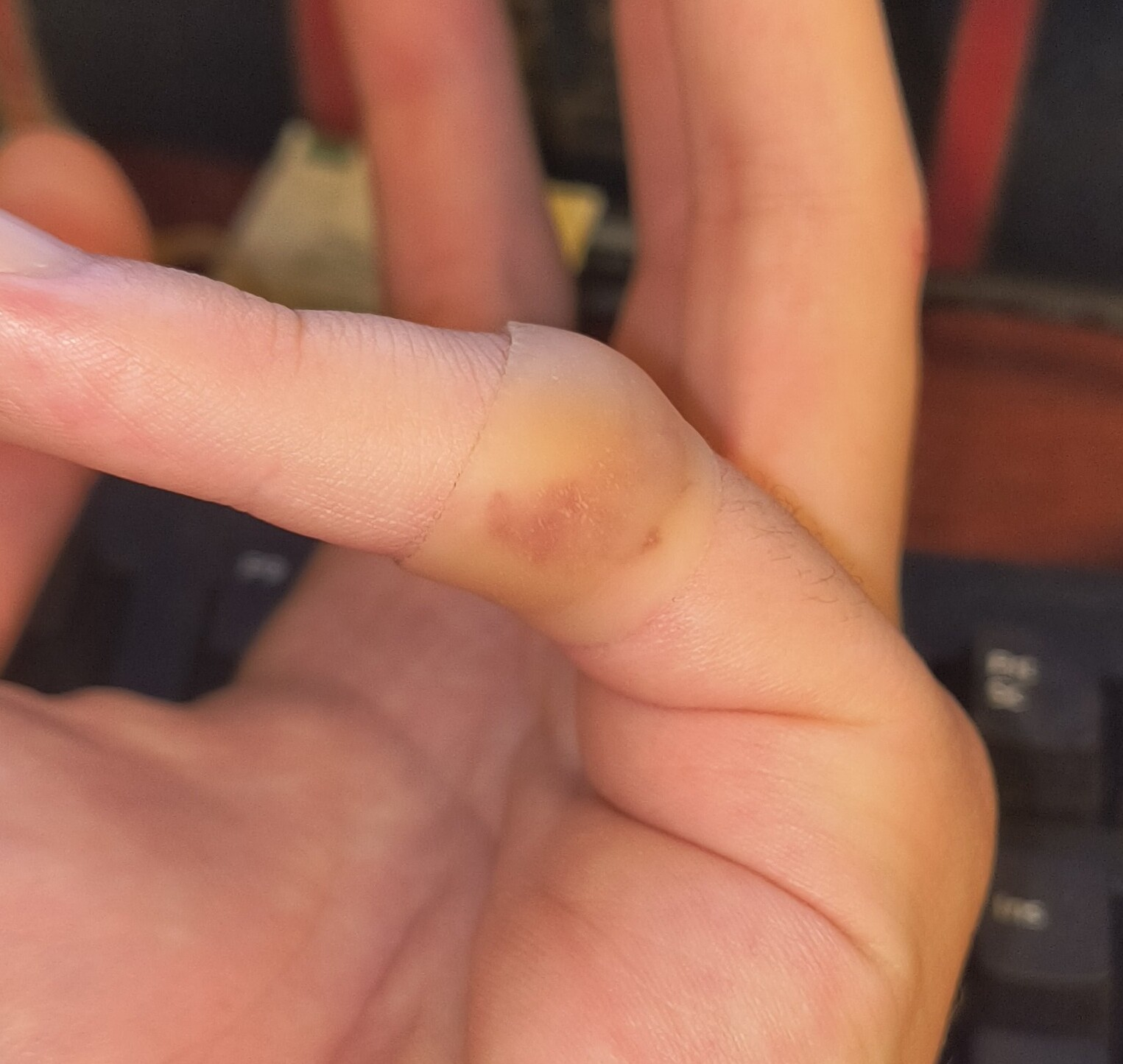
A hydrocolloid dressing on a finger

The dressing is applied to a cleaned wound, and usually used to treat uninfected wounds. The dressings may be used, under medical supervision and with an antibiotic to treat the infection, even where aerobic bacterial infection is present.

In addition to treating abrasions, minor incisions and lacerations, and superficial puncture wounds, hydrocolloid dressings are used to cover skin-graft donor sites, burns, and cutaneous ulcers (including pressure ulcers or "bed sores", venous ulcers, and diabetic foot ulcers).

Small hydrocolloid patches are sometimes also used for acne, to heal the pimples and avoid scars from them.

Large dressings with a consistent, adhesive film across the active side (rather than a central pad of hydrocolloid foam) can be cut into smaller strips or other shapes, for use in place of a traditional adhesive bandage of the same size.

An indirectly medical use of strips of hydrocolloid dressing is as an alternative to surgical tape, e.g. to secure a nasogastric tube or CPAP mask to a patient's face.

== Efficacy ==
Hydrocolloid has been shown to be superior to other dressing substrates (e.g., alginate, film, gauze, hydrofiber, or silicone) tested for treating skin-graft donor sites.

There is tentative but unclear (as of 2013) evidence for the efficacy of hydrocolloid dressings for superficial and partial-thickness burns.

The results of meta-analyses indicate no significant difference in healing rates between hydrocolloid dressings and other dressings (including simple gauze dressings) for venous ulcers, or for diabetic foot ulcers.

== History ==
The term "hydrocolloid" was coined in the 1960s during the development of mucoadhesives, first used to treat mouth ulcers. The term was later adopted for a new dressing type in which a hydrophilic gelable mass was applied to a flexible semipermeable carrier. It was first sold under the brand Granuflex in the United Kingdom in 1982, and then DuoDERM in the United States in 1983. Different products subsequently came to market with slightly varying formulations, designed for specific areas of the body or specific purposes (for example, postoperative dressings). More recently, the term has sometimes been used to describe hydrogel dressings which are fundamentally different to hydrocolloid dressings.
