= Calcium alginate =

Names
- IUPAC name Calcium β-D-mannopyranuronosyl-(1→4)- α-L-gulopyranuronosyl-(1→4)- α-L-gulopyranuronate
- Other names E404

Identifiers
CAS Number	9005-35-0
ChemSpider	24589538
ECHA InfoCard	100.124.785
E number	E404 (thickeners, ...)
UNII	8P20S56HZI
CompTox Dashboard (EPA)	DTXSID3093810

Properties
Chemical formula	(C_{12}H_{14}CaO_{12})_{n}
Appearance	Solid

Pharmacology
ATC code	B02BC08 (WHO)

Hazards
- Lethal dose or concentration (LD, LC)
LD_{50} (median dose)	>15g/kg
- Except where otherwise noted, data are given for materials in their standard state (at 25 °C [77 °F], 100 kPa). Infobox references

Calcium alginate is a water-insoluble, gelatinous, cream-coloured substance that can be created through the addition of aqueous calcium chloride to aqueous sodium alginate. Calcium alginate is also used for entrapment of enzymes and forming artificial seeds in plant tissue culture.

"Alginate" is usually the salts of alginic acid, but it can also refer to derivatives of alginic acid and alginic acid itself; in some publications the term "algin" is used instead of alginate. Alginate is present in the cell walls of brown algae, as the calcium, magnesium and sodium salts of alginic acid.

== Preparation ==
=== Extraction of alginate ===
To extract the alginate, the seaweed is broken into pieces and stirred with a hot solution of an alkali, usually sodium carbonate. Over a period of about two hours, the alginate dissolves as sodium alginate to give a very thick slurry. This slurry also contains the part of the seaweed that does not dissolve, mainly cellulose. This insoluble residue must be removed from the solution. The solution is too thick (viscous) to be filtered and must be diluted with a very large quantity of water. After dilution, the solution is forced through a filter cloth in a filter press. However, the pieces of undissolved residue are very fine and can quickly clog the filter cloth. Therefore, before filtration is started, a filter aid, such as diatomaceous earth, must be added; this holds most of the fine particles away from the surface of the filter cloth and facilitates filtration. However, filter aid is expensive and can make a significant contribution to costs. To reduce the quantity of filter aid needed, some processors force air into the extract as it is being diluted with water (the extract and diluting water are mixed in an in-line mixer into which air is forced). Fine air bubbles attach themselves to the particles of residue. The diluted extract is left standing for several hours while the air rises to the top, taking the residue particles with it. This frothy mix of air and residue is removed from the top and the solution is withdrawn from the bottom and pumped to the filter.

=== Preparation of calcium alginate from sodium alginate ===
Calcium alginate can be produced from a sodium alginate solution by the addition of a calcium salt such as calcium chloride. This forms insoluble calcium alginate salt which precipitates out of solution. The calcium alginate may then be redissolved in various sodium carbonate solutions to produce alginate products containing specific ratios of sodium to calcium. This influences the alginate's physical and chemical properties.

== Structure ==
Because of their technological importance, the structure of calcium alginate hydrogels has long been a subject of scientific investigation. The most famous theory of alginate-metal binding is the "Egg-Box" model, proposed in the 1970s. This model is based on the unique arrangement of hydroxyl groups of the polymeric α-L-guluronate (G) units, which provide cavities for cations to sit in like eggs in an egg box. Whilst the reality is likely to be much more complicated, the Egg-Box model is a useful explanatory tool and the original paper proposing the model now has over 1500 citations.

== Uses ==
Uses of calcium alginate include:

- Plant tissue culturing to produce insoluble artificial seeds
- Immobilizing enzymes by entrapment
- To produce an edible substance
- Incorporation into wound dressings (alginate dressings) as a hemostatic
- An alginate hydrogel that can be used for a controlled-release drug delivery system
- Molecular gastronomy, for spherification.
