= Dressing (medicine) =

Pad or compress applied to wounds

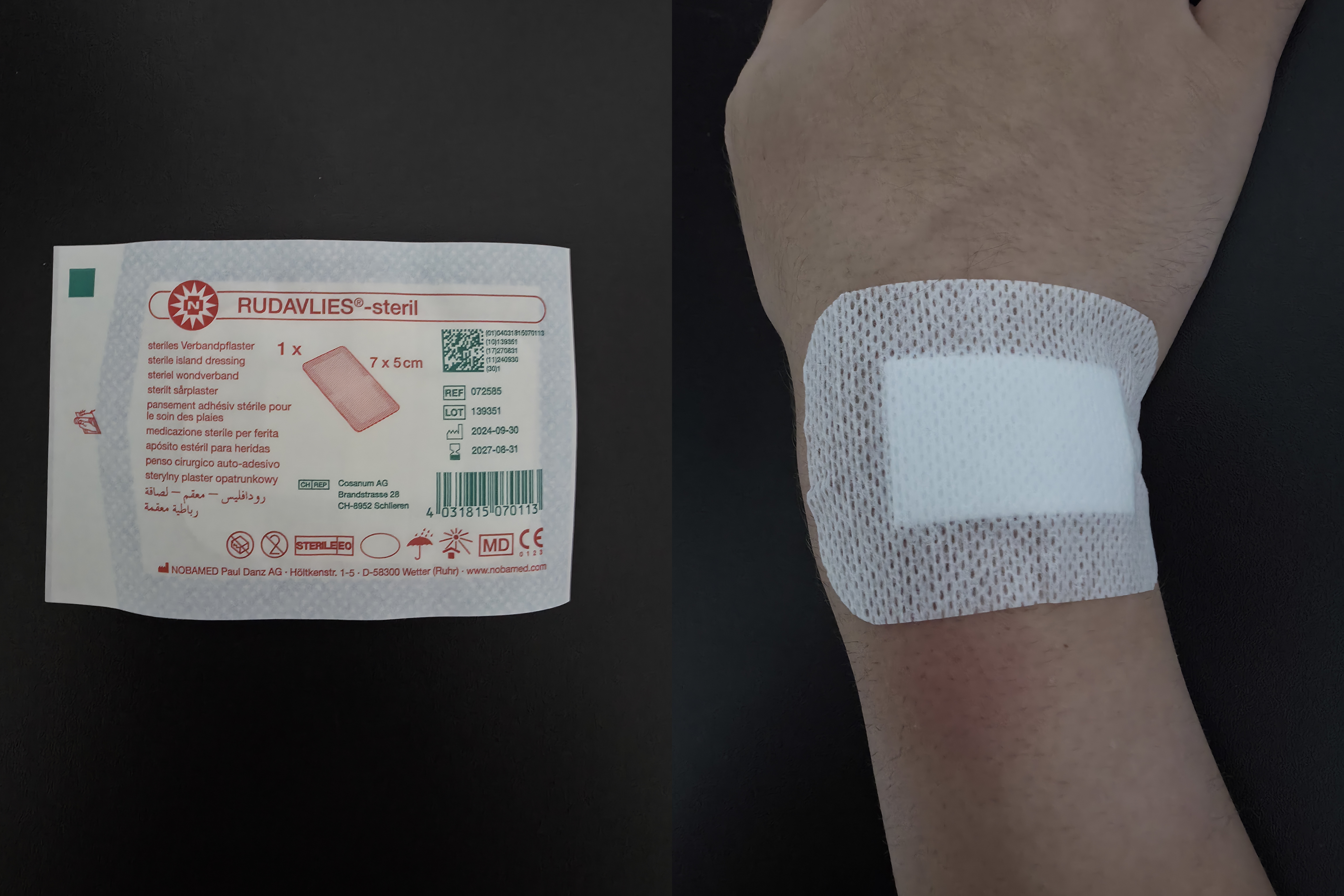
An adhesive island dressing, in its original packaging (left) and on a person's wrist (right)

A dressing or compress is a piece of material such as a pad applied to a wound to promote healing and protect the wound from further harm. A dressing is designed to be in direct contact with the wound, as distinguished from a bandage, which is most often used to hold a dressing in place. Most modern dressings are sterile.

== Medical uses ==
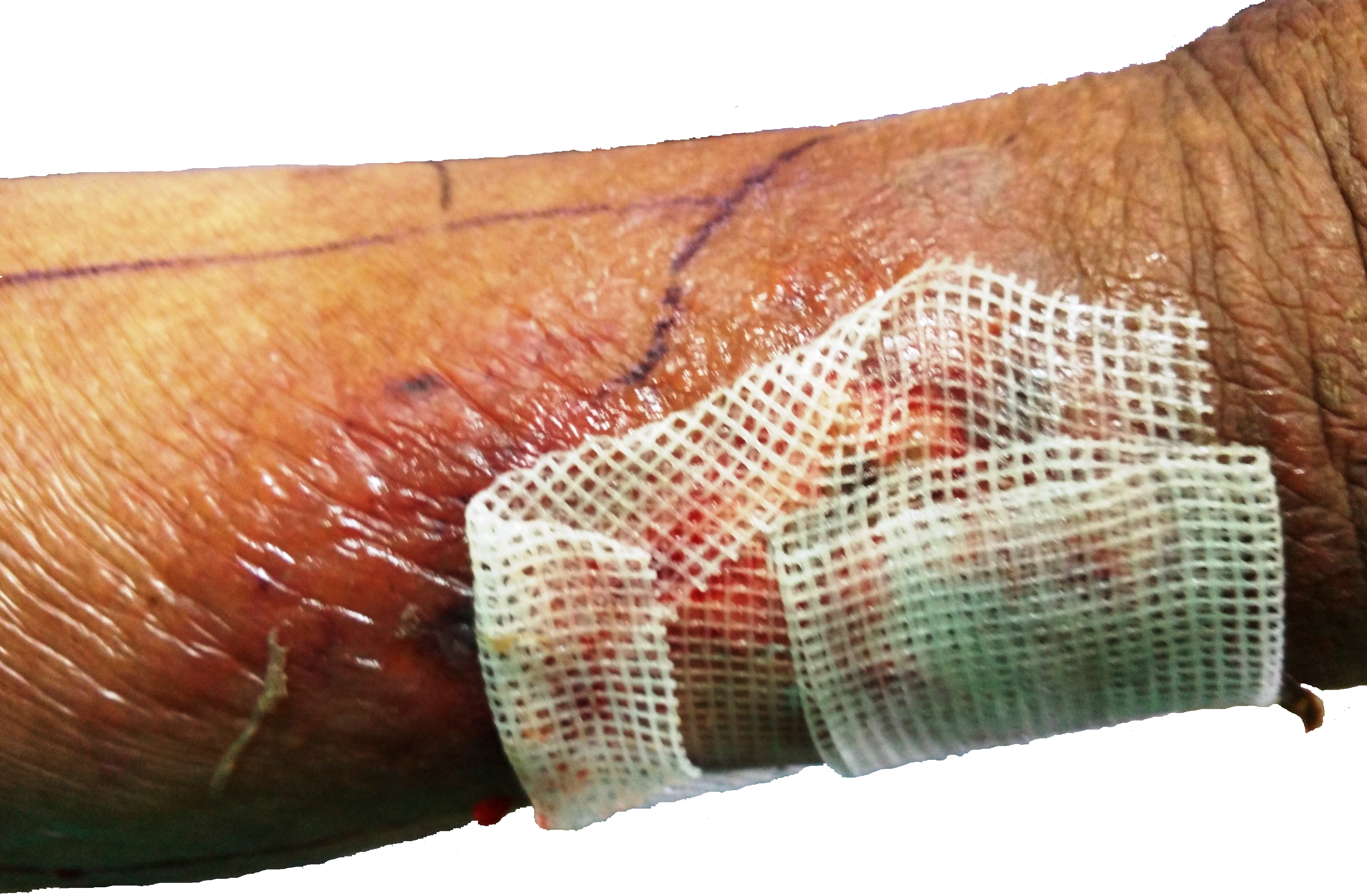
Application of paraffin gauze on a cellulitis infected wound

A dressing can have a number of purposes, depending on the type, severity and position of the wound, although all purposes are focused on promoting recovery and protecting from further harm. Key purposes of a dressing are:

- Stop bleeding – to help to seal the wound to expedite the clotting process;
- Protection from infection – to defend the wound against germs and mechanical damage;
- Absorb exudate – to soak up blood, plasma, and other fluids exuded from the wound, containing it/them in one place and preventing maceration;
- Ease pain – either by a medicated analgesic effect, compression or simply preventing pain from further trauma;
- Debride the wound – to remove slough and foreign objects from the wound to expedite healing;
- Reduce psychological stress – to obscure a healing wound from the view of the patient and others.

Ultimately, the aim of a dressing is to promote healing of the wound by providing a sterile, breathable and moist environment that facilitates granulation and epithelialization. This will then reduce the risk of infection, help the wound heal more quickly, and reduce scarring.

Applying, or changing a dressing is a first aid skill, although many people undertake the practice with no training – especially on minor wounds. Modern dressings will almost all come in a prepackaged sterile wrapping, date coded to ensure sterility.

Historically, in emergencies and in many less developed regions, dressings are often improvised using available materials such as clothing or spare fabric. These makeshift dressings can serve basic functions like stemming bleeding and absorbing exudate, though, such improvised dressings often need to be used in combination with antiseptic solutions like povidone-iodine to reduce the chances of infection.

== Types ==
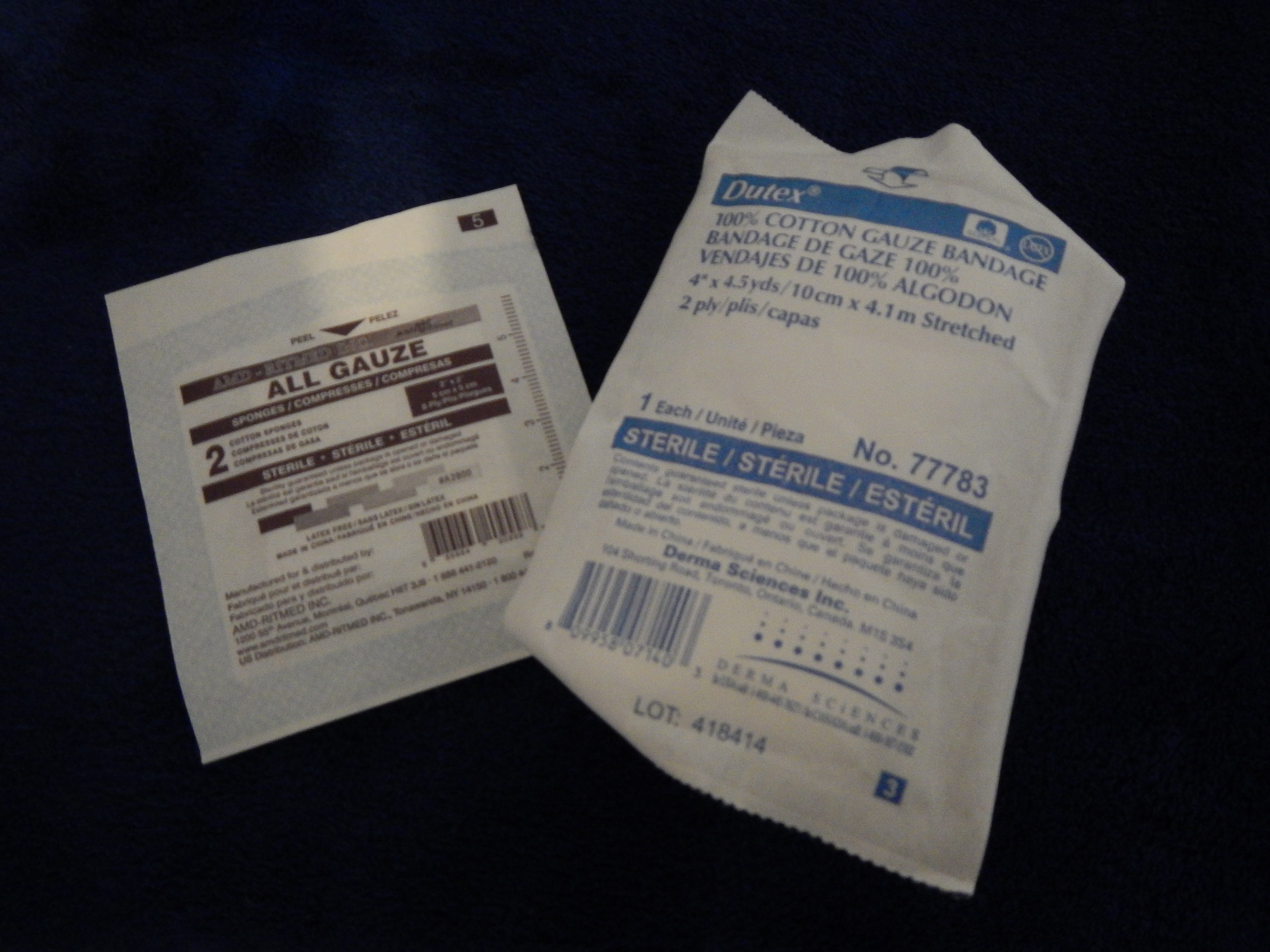
Two packages of gauze; the left package contains gauze compresses in 5 cm × 5 cm (25 cm²), and the other, right package contains a 2 ply all cotton gauze bandage in 10 cm × 4.1 m (stretched)

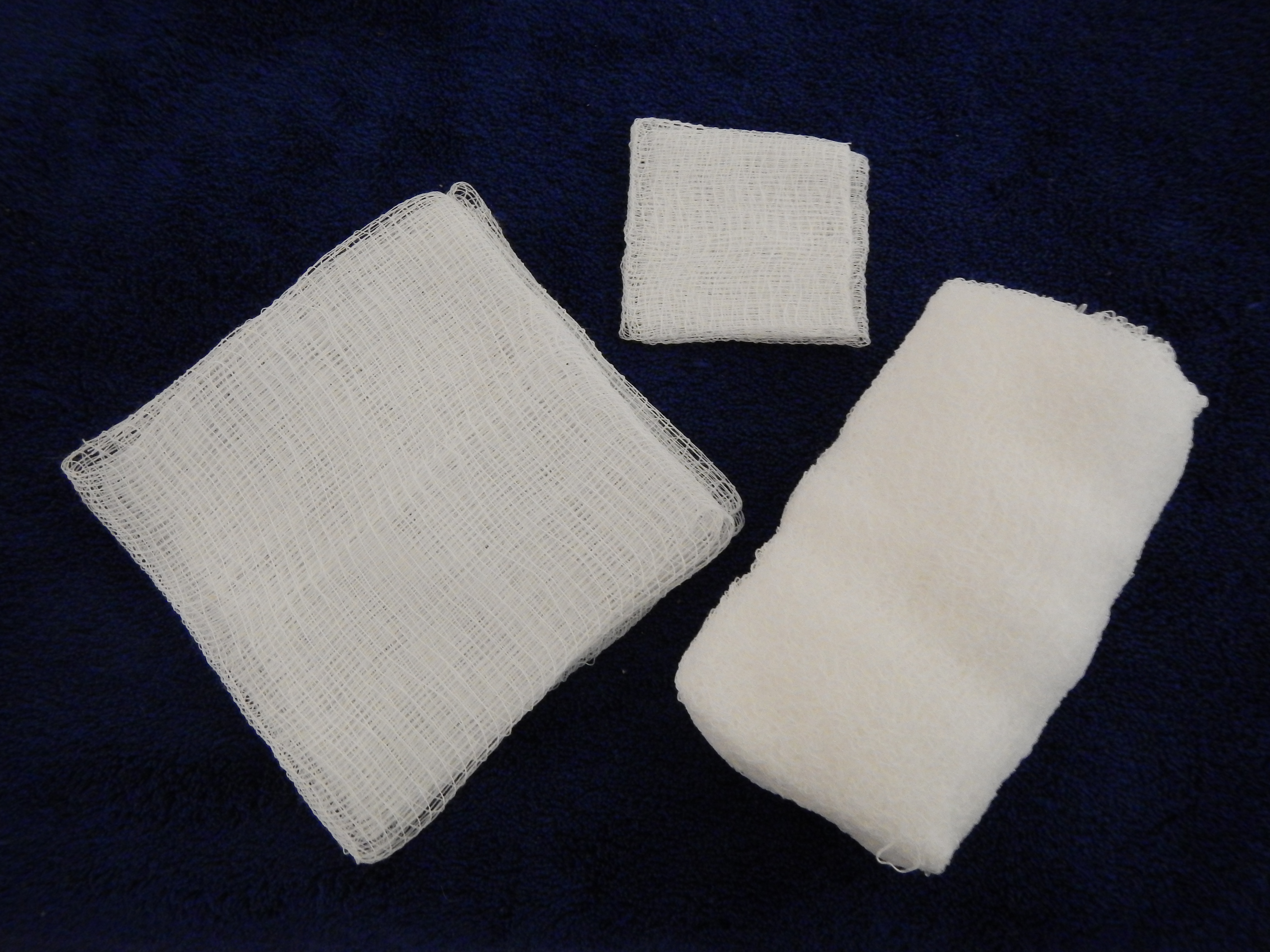
The unpackaged gauzes from the picture above; the 2 gauzes on the left are gauze compresses in different sizes and the gauze on the right is a cotton gauze bandage.

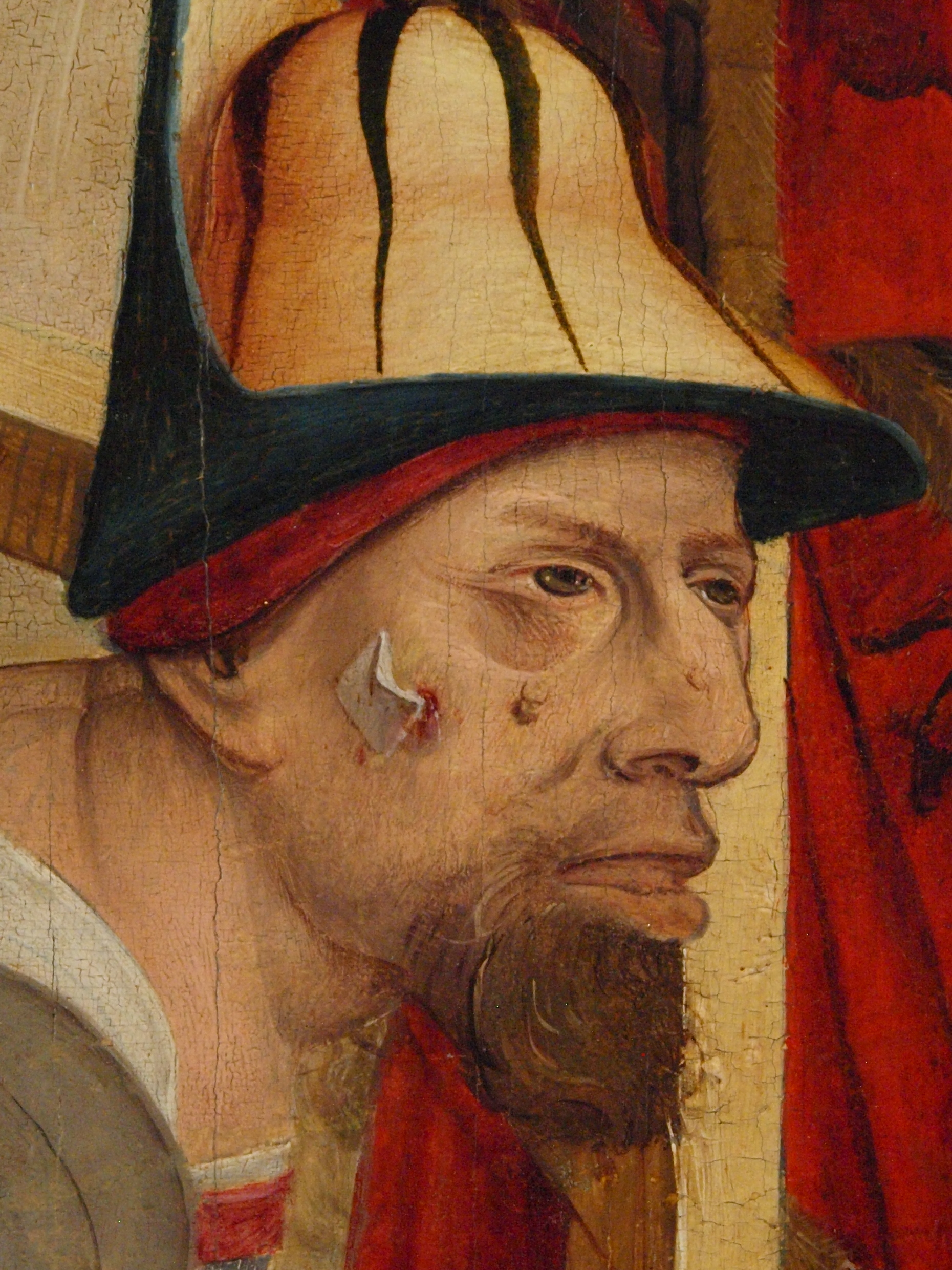
Depiction of a dressing on a face from a painting from 1490

Modern dressings include dry or impregnated gauze, plastic films, gels, foams, hydrocolloids, hydrogels, and alginates. They provide different physical environments suited to different wounds:

- Absorption of exudate, to regulate the moisture level surrounding the wound- for example, dry gauzes absorb exudate strongly, drying the wound, hydrocolloids maintain a moist environment and film dressings do not absorb exudate;
- Gas permeability and exchange, especially with regard to oxygen and water vapour;
- Maintaining the optimum temperature to encourage healing;
- Mechanically debriding a wound to remove slough.
- Pressure dressings are commonly used to treat burns and after skin grafts. They apply pressure and prevent fluids from collecting in the tissue.

Dressings can also regulate the chemical environment of a wound, usually with the aim of preventing infection by the impregnation of topical antiseptics. Commonly used antiseptics include silver and DACC,povidone-iodine, boracic lint dressings or historically castor oil. Antibiotics are also often used with dressings to prevent bacterial infection. Medical grade honey is another antiseptic option, and there is moderate evidence that honey dressings are more effective than common antiseptic and gauze for healing infected post-operative wounds. Bioelectric dressings can be effective in attacking certain antibiotic-resistant bacteria and speeding up the healing process.

Dressings are also often impregnated with analgesics to reduce pain.

The physical features of a dressing can impact the efficacy of such topical medications. Occlusive dressings, made from substances impervious to moisture such as plastic or latex, can be used to increase their rate of absorption into the skin.

Dressings are usually secured with adhesive tape and/or a bandage. Many dressings today are produced as an "island" surrounded by an adhesive backing, ready for immediate application – these are known as island dressings.

=== Passive products ===
Generally, these products are indicated for only superficial, clean, and dry wounds with minimal exudates. They can also be used as secondary dressings (additional dressings to secure the primary dressing in place or to absorb additional discharge from the wound). Examples are: Gauze, lint, adhesive bandage (plasters), and cotton wool. The main aim is to protect the wound from bacterial contamination. They are also used for secondary dressing. Gauze dressing is made up of woven or non-woven fibres of cotton, rayon, and polyester. Gauze dressing are capable of absorbing discharge from wound but requires frequent changing. Excessive wound discharge would cause the gauze to adhere to the wound, thus causes pain when trying to remove the gauze from the wound. Bandages are made up of cotton wool, cellulose, or polyamide materials. Cotton bandages can act as a secondary dressing while compression bandages provides good compressions for venous ulcers. On the other hand, tulle gras dressing which is impregnated with paraffin oil is indicated for superficial clean wound.

=== Interactive products ===
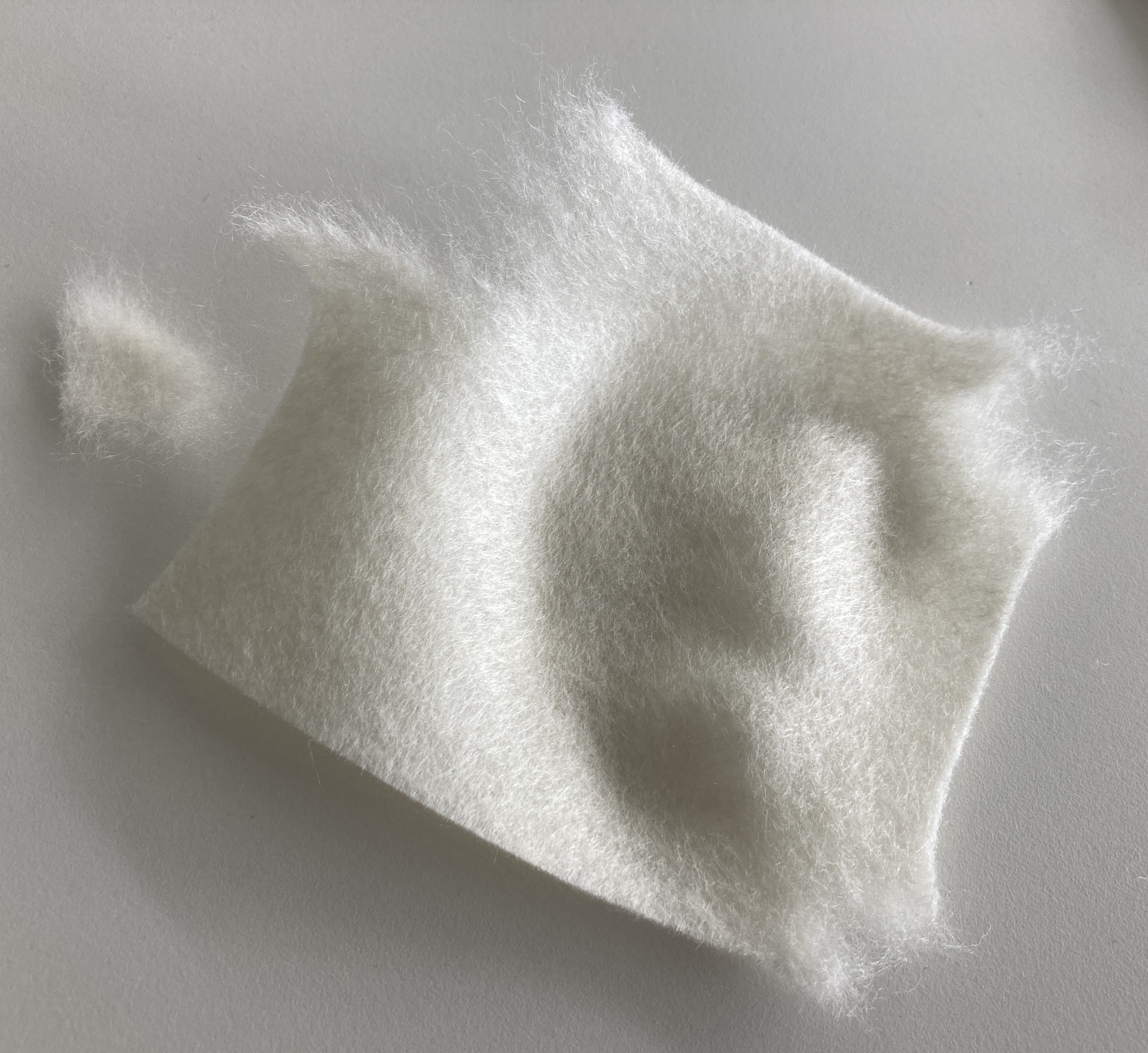
Alginate dressing

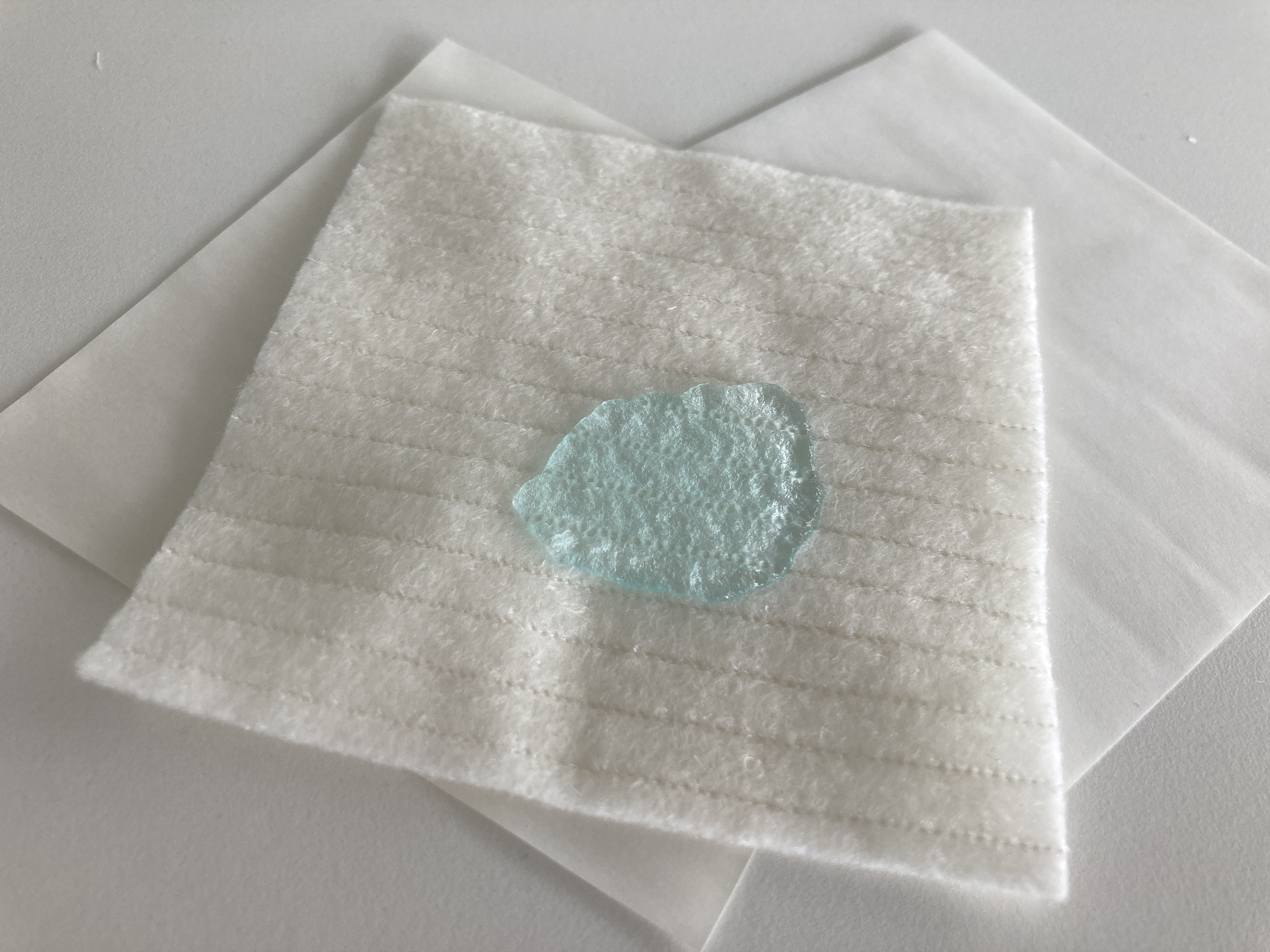
Hydrofiber forming gel

Several types of interactive products are: semi-permeable film dressings, semi-permeable foam dressings, hydrogel dressings, hydrocolloid dressings, hydrofiber and alginate dressings. Apart from preventing bacteria contamination of the wound, they keep the wound environment moist in order to promote healing.

Semi-permeable film dressing: This dressing is a transparent film made up of polyurethane. It allows the movement of water vapor, oxygen, and carbon dioxide into and out of the dressing. It also plays an additional role in autolytic debridement (removal of dead tissue) which is less painful when compared to manual wound debridement inside the operating theater. It is highly elastic and flexible, thus is closely adhered to the skin. As the dressing is transparent, wound inspection is possible without removing the dressing. Due to the limited absorption capacity, such dressing is only used in superficial wounds with low amount of discharge.

Semi-permeable foam dressing: This dressing is made up of foam with hydrophilic (attracted to water) properties and outer layer of hydrophobic (repelled from water) properties with adhesive borders. The hydrophobic layer protects the wound from the outside fluid contamination. Meanwhile, the inner hydrophilic layer is able to absorb moderate amount of discharge from the wound. Therefore, this type of dressing is useful for wound with high amount of discharge and for wound with granulation tissue. Secondary dressings are not required. However, it requires frequent changing and is not suitable for dry wounds. Silicone is a common material that make up the foam. The foam is able to mold according to the shape of the wound.

Hydrogel dressing: This dressing is made up of synthetic polymers such as methacrylate and polyvinyl pyrrolidine. It has high water content, thus provides moisture and cooling effect for the wound. The dressing is easy to remove from the wound without causing any damage. The dressing is also non-irritant. Therefore, it is used for dry necrotic wound, necrotic wound, pressure ulcers, and burn wound. It is not suitable for wounds with heavy discharge and infected wounds.

Hydrocolloid dressing: This type of dressing contains two layers: inner colloidal layer and outer waterproof layer. It contains gel forming agents such as carboxymethylcellulose, gelatin and pectin. When the dressing is in contact with the wound, the wound discharge are retained to form gel which provides moist environment for wound healing. It protects the wound from bacterial contamination, absorbs wound discharge, and digests necrotic tissues. It is mostly use as secondary dressing. However, it is not used in wound with high discharge and neuropathic ulcers.

Alginate dressing: This type of dressing is made up of either sodium or calcium salt of alginic acid. This dressing can absorb high amount of discharge from a wound. Ions present in the dressing can interact with blood to produce a film that protects the wound from bacterial contamination. However, this dressing is not suitable for dry wounds, third degree burn wound, and deep wounds with exposed bone. It also requires secondary dressing because wounds can quickly dry up with alginate dressing.

Hydrofiber dressing: Made up of sodium carboxymethyl cellulose, hydrofibers can absorb high amounts of wound discharge, forming a gel and preventing skin maceration.

=== Bioactive products ===
Many biologics, skin substitutes, biomembranes and scaffolds have been developed to facilitate wound healing through various mechanisms.

== See also ==
- Esmarch bandage
- Field dressing (bandage)
- History of wound care § Wound-site dressing
- Hydrocolloid dressing
- Hydrogel dressing
