= Hydrogel dressing =

Medical dressing based on hydrogels

Hydrogel dressing is a medical dressing based on hydrogels – flexible, three-dimensional hydrophilic structures. The insoluble hydrophilic structures absorb polar wound exudates and allow oxygen diffusion at the wound bed to accelerate healing. Hydrogel dressings can be designed to prevent bacterial infection, retain moisture, promote optimum adhesion to tissues, and satisfy the basic requirements of biocompatibility. Hydrogel dressings can also be designed to respond to changes in the microenvironment at the wound bed. Hydrogel dressings should promote an appropriate microenvironment for angiogenesis, recruitment of fibroblasts, and cellular proliferation.

Hydrogels respond elastically to applied stress; gels made from materials like collagen exhibit high toughness and low sliding friction, reducing damage from mechanical stress. Hydrogel dressings should possess mechanical and physical properties similar to the 3D microenvironment of the extracellular matrix of human skin. Hydrogel wound dressings are designed to have a mechanism for application and removal which minimizes further trauma to tissues.

Hydrogel dressings can be sorted into three categories: synthetic, natural, and hybrid. Synthetic hydrogel dressings have been produced using biomimetic extracellular matrix nanofibers such as polyvinyl alcohol (PVA). Self-assembling designer peptide hydrogels are another type of synthetic hydrogel in development. Natural hydrogel dressings are further subdivided into either polysaccharide-based (e.g. alginates) or proteoglycan- and/or protein-based (e.g. collagen). Hybrid hydrogel dressings incorporate synthetic nanoparticles and natural materials.

== Characteristics ==
=== Chemical characteristics ===
Hydrogel dressings exhibit chemical or physical cross-linking. Chemical cross-linking involves formation of covalent bonds between polymer chains. Chemically cross-linked hydrogel dressings are synthesized by chain-growth polymerization, step-growth polymerization, enzymes, or irradiation polymerization. Synthetic dressings incorporating nanoparticles such as PVA and polyethylene glycol (PEG) are assembled using chemical cross-linking mechanisms. Physically cross-linked hydrogel dressings are assembled via ionic interaction, hydrogen bonding, hydrophobic interactions, or crystallization. Physically cross-linked hydrogels disintegrate due to local changes in pH, ionic strength, and temperature. Natural dressings incorporating polysaccharides and proteoglycans/proteins form a 3D network using physical cross-linking. Hydrogel dressings mimic the cross-linked 3D network of extracellular matrix fibers in human skin.

Hydrogels can be formed through a self-assembly process in which monomers diffuse in solution then form noncovalent interactions. Hydrogels used in wound dressings can be self-assembled upon addition of divalent metal cations or electrically charged polysaccharides due to electrostatic interactions. Self-assembly via hydrophobic interactions can be induced in amphiphilic polysaccharide-based gels by addition of water; it can also be induced in non amphiphilic polysaccharide-based hydrogels by the addition of hydrophobic grafts.

Cross-linking of soluble hydrophilic monomers forms a 3D insoluble netted structure which can incorporate a large amount of water. The 3D polymeric network of hydrogels is highly hydrated with 90-99% water w/w; it is capable of binding many times more water molecules when assembled than in the uncross-linked state. Hydrogel dressings can absorb up to 600 times their initial amount of water, including fluid-based wound exudates. Hydrogels are effective biomaterials for wound dressings and tissue engineering because they exchange fluid, hydrating necrotic tissues. The absorption of secretions causes the hydrogel dressing to swell, expanding the cross links in the polymer chains. The expanded 3D cross-linked network can irreversibly incorporate pathogens and detritus, thereby removing them from the wound.

Some hydrogel dressings have intrinsic antimicrobial properties. Hydrogel dressings formed from antimicrobial peptides (AMPs) and chitosan have inherent antimicrobial activity. The antimicrobial properties of hydrogel dressings can be enhanced by addition of metal nanoparticles, antibiotics, or other antimicrobial agents. Silver and gold nanoparticles can also be incorporated into hydrogel dressings to enhance antimicrobial activity. Some hydrogel dressings have antibiotics such as ciprofloxacin and amoxicillin incorporated into their structure which are unloaded into the wound as fluid is exchanged. Some hydrogel dressings have incorporated stimuli-responsive nitric oxide-releasing agents and other antimicrobial agents.

Hydrogel dressings can adhere directly to the wound bed under normal physiological conditions via oxidation-reduction reactions of quinones. The adhesive properties of hydrogels have been shown to be enhanced by addition of positively charged microgels (MR) into the 3D matrix to increase electrostatic and hydrophobic interactions.

=== Physical characteristics ===
Wound dressings should be stretchable to prevent tearing. Hai Lei et al. demonstrated that poor elasticity and hysteresis in naturally-derived protein-based hydrogels can be remedied by the addition of polyprotein cross-linkers. The flexibility of hydrogels can also be enhanced by incorporating microgels into the matrix. Hydrogel dressings mimic the fibrous nature of native ECM to maintain cell-to-cell communication at the wound bed for tissue regeneration.

Self-healing hydrogels automatically and reversibly repair damage done due to mechanical and chemical stress. Self-healing mechanisms can involve "dynamic covalent bonding, non-covalent interactions", and mixed interactions. Covalent interactions involved in self-healing include Schiff base formation and disulfide exchange. Non-covalent interactions are generally less stable and make the hydrogel more sensitive to microenvironmental changes (e.g. pH, temperature). Some hydrogel dressings are self-healing due to mixed mechanisms such as host-guest and protein-ligand interactions.

Hydrogel dressings are available in sheet, amorphous, impregnated, or sprayable forms. Sheet-form hydrogel dressings are non-adhesive against the wound and are effective in healing partial-thickness wounds. Amorphous hydrogels are more effective than sheet-form dressings in treatment of full-thickness wounds because they can conform to the shape of the wound bed and facilitate autolytic debridement. Impregnated hydrogel dressings are dry dressings (e.g. gauzes) saturated with an amorphous hydrogel. Sprayable hydrogel dressings are composed of amorphous hydrogels which rapidly increase in viscosity after application. Sprayable hydrogels have also been shown to increase the penetration and efficacy of therapeutic agents.

==== "Smart" hydrogel dressings ====
"Smart" hydrogels which are stimuli-responsive (i.e. thermoresponsive, bioresponsive, pH-responsive, photoresponsive, and redox-responsive) are also being produced.

- pH-responsive hydrogel dressings release growth factors and antibiotic agents as the pH of the wound increases from normal skin levels (pH 4–6) to internal levels (pH ~7.4).
- Redox-responsive hydrogel dressings can be disintegrated on-demand by addition of a reducing agent.
- Assembly of the 3D network of photoresponsive hydrogel dressings is initiated by UV radiation.
- Thermoresponsive hydrogel dressings exhibit temperature-dependent sol-gel transition and/or temperature-dependent drug release.

== Applications ==
The efficacy of hydrogel dressings has been assessed on various wound types. There is some evidence to suggest that hydrogels are effective dressings for chronic wounds including pressure ulcers, diabetic ulcers, and venous ulcers although the results are uncertain. Hydrogels have been shown to accelerate healing in partial and full thickness burn wounds of varying size. Other studies have shown that hydrogel dressings accelerate healing in radioactive skin injuries and dog bite wounds. Hydrogel dressings decrease the healing time of traumatic skin injuries by an average 5.28 days and reduce the pain reported by patients.

== Types ==
=== Naturally-derived hydrogel dressings ===
Polysaccharide-based hydrogel dressings have been synthesized from polymers such as hyaluronic acid, chitin, chitosan, alginate, and agarose. Naturally-derived protein/proteoglycan hydrogel dressings have been synthesized from polymers such as collagen, gelatin, kappa-carrageenan, and fibrin.

=== Synthetic hydrogel dressings ===
Synthetic hydrogel dressings may be derived from synthetic polymers such as polyvinyl alcohol (PVA), poly(ethylene glycol) (PEG), polyurethane (PU), and poly(lactide-co-glycolide) (PLGA). Synthetic hydrogel dressings may also be formed from designer peptides. Researchers are applying 3D printing to the synthesis of hydrogel dressings.

=== Biohybrid hydrogel dressings ===
Hydrogels may be modified to incorporate metal cations (e.g. copper (II)), degradable linkers (e.g. dextran), and adhesive functional groups (e.g. RGD). Integrating biological derivatives into synthetic hydrogels allows producers to tailor binding affinities and specificity, mechanical properties, and stimuli-responsive properties.
