= Indian balsam =

Indian Balsam may refer to:

- Balsam of Peru, from Myroxylon, a genus of tree in the family Fabaceae
- Impatiens glandulifera, a species of plant in the family Balsaminaceae
