= Diathesis =

Diathesis (from the Greek διάθεσις "grammatical voice, disposition") may refer to:

- Grammatical voice
- Diathesis (medical), a hereditary or constitutional predisposition to a disease or other disorder
  - Predisposition (psychology)
    - The diathesis–stress model
  - Bleeding diathesis, an abnormal propensity toward bleeding
