= Hand eczema =

Skin condition

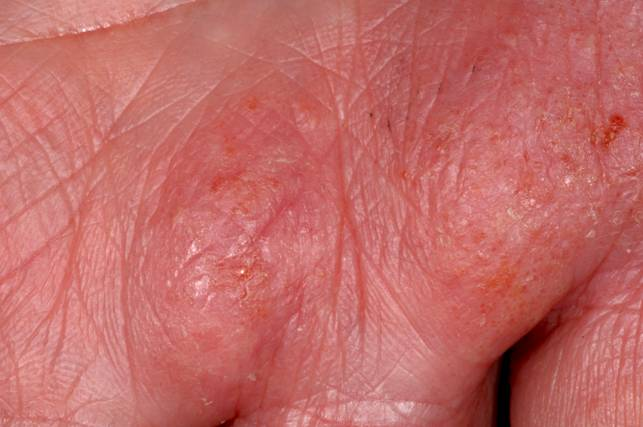
- A picture of dyshidrotic hand eczema
- Specialty: Dermatology
- Complications: Disfigurement

Hand eczema presents on the palms and soles, and may sometimes be difficult or impossible to differentiate from atopic dermatitis, allergic contact dermatitis, and psoriasis, which also commonly involve the hands. Even a biopsy of all these conditions may not result in a definitive diagnosis, as all three conditions may demonstrate spongiosis and crusting on the hands.

Non-communicable inflammation of the skin of the hands is referred to as hand eczema. Hand eczema is widely prevalent and, as it is a very visible condition associated with severe itching or pain, has serious consequences for the affected person including a high psychological impact. Different disease patterns can be identified according to the course of the illness, appearance of symptoms, degree of severity, or catalysts. Prognosis is hard to predict for individual cases of chronic hand eczema and usually differs from patient to patient. Successful treatment depends on determining the causes of the condition, obtaining an accurate diagnosis, sustainable hand protection procedures and an early, extensive, and where appropriate internal treatment.

== Signs and symptoms ==
Normally, skin inflammation connected with hand eczema is accompanied by blister formation and pronounced itching, but solid calluses and painful tearing may also occur. The quality of life of the affected person is seriously diminished, especially in the case of chronic forms of the illness, and psychological impact is often very high. This impact is enhanced by the high visibility of the illness on the hands, which may lead to feelings of shame and fear of rejection.

== Causes ==
There are a number of different causes of skin inflammation of the hands, the interplay of which is also significant: environmental factors such as excessive water, contact with allergens or irritants, smoking and genetic disposition. A single catalyst is seldom responsible for the development of hand eczema in patients.

=== Differences according to catalysts ===
Three main factors play an essential role in the development of chronic hand eczema: excessive contact with water and irritants (cumulative-toxic stress), contact with allergens, and atopic diathesis, which has a genetic component. Individual hand eczema types are identified and named according to the main catalysts involved, i.e. cumulative-toxic, contact-allergenic, or atopic hand eczema. Activities that are stressful for the skin or involve repeated, excessive contact with water or skin-irritating substances at work or home can cause damage to the skin's protective abilities and increase the chances of inflammation. This also applies to prolonged wearing of protective rubber gloves and similar materials, since sweating occurs within these gloves. Disturbance of the skin's protective barrier also facilitates penetration by allergenic substances and promotes the development of contact dermatitis. Contact allergies play a very important role in the development of hand eczema. If the hand is subjected to repeated contact with a substance that leads to an allergy, the skin reacts with signs of inflammation. Numerous people affected by hand eczema also experience skin inflammation on their feet. Often, a contact allergy to an ingredient in shoe leather treatment may be the catalyst. Contact allergies in certain types of employment are especially problematic, particularly if the work involves the handling of allergenic materials, e.g. masonry work or hairdressing.

People allergic to Balsam of Peru may experience a flare-up of hand eczema if they use or consume products that use it as an ingredient.

Severe and chronic eczema qualifies as one of the most frequent occupational illnesses. Patients should therefore be referred to an occupational-dermatological specialist as soon as possible. Patients with a history of neurodermitis, hay fever, or allergic asthma often develop hand eczema. These sicknesses reflect the individual's particular susceptibility or genetic predisposition to react over-sensitively to various environmental influences. This is described as atopy or atopy diathesis. Atopic diathesis is frequently accompanied by genetically conditioned problems with the skin's protective barriers, which causes a weakening of the skin's resistance against irritating substances and moisture, as well as easier penetration by allergens, which may lead to the development of contact allergies.

=== Differences according to prevailing signs of skin illness (morphology) ===
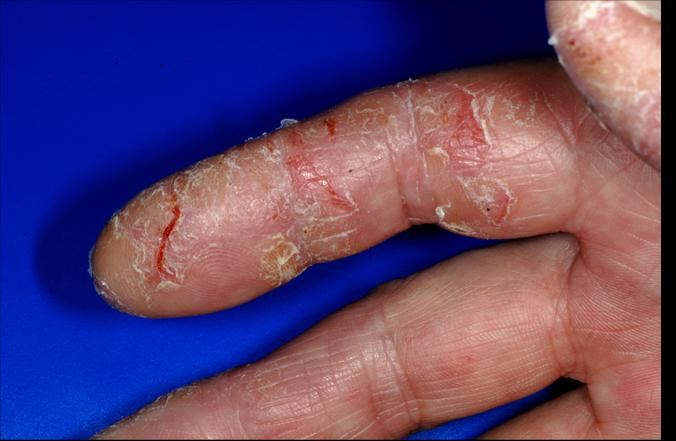
hyperkeratotic fissured hand eczema

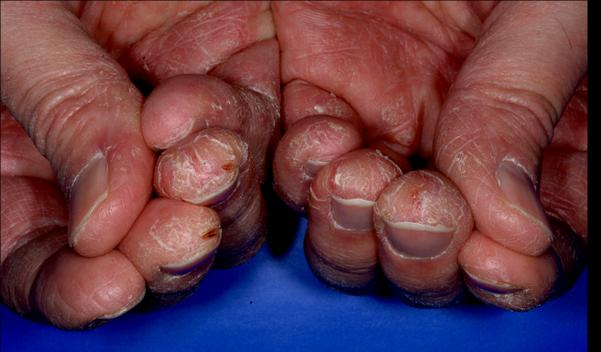
fingertip eczema

The clinical appearance of various subtypes of hand eczema differs. The term dyshidrotic hand eczema is used to describe formations that mainly exhibit pronounced, itching blister formations, while callus and tear formations typically indicate hyperkeratotic fissured hand eczema.

=== Differences according to degree of severity and course ===
Independent of the triggering cause or the prevailing signs of skin illness, the selection and planning of treatment options is important, since different types of illness also differ in terms of their degree of severity and the course of the illness.

While light hand eczema heals relatively quickly following dermatological therapy and patient participation, more pronounced hand eczema may persist over several weeks. Severe hand eczema is characterised by consistent or recurring, extended inflammation of the skin that severely affects the patient. Hand eczema is described as chronic if it lasts at least 3 months in spite of dermatological treatment, or if it recurs at least twice within a period of 12 months (relapsed) . Severe and chronic patterns of hand eczema are often resilient to treatment, making the condition extremely stressful for those affected.

== Diagnosis ==
During diagnosis it is important to determine the type of hand eczema and plan specific treatment accordingly. An additional diagnosis of allergies will indicate whether contact allergies or atopy diathesis are the cause of the hand eczema. Discussion concerning frequency of contact with water, irritants, and allergens in private and professional environments will also help evaluate individual stresses on the patient's skin. The hands may also exhibit various other skin illnesses and potential fungal infection or psoriasis must be ruled out. Usually, taking the patient's personal history into account will help provide an accurate diagnosis.

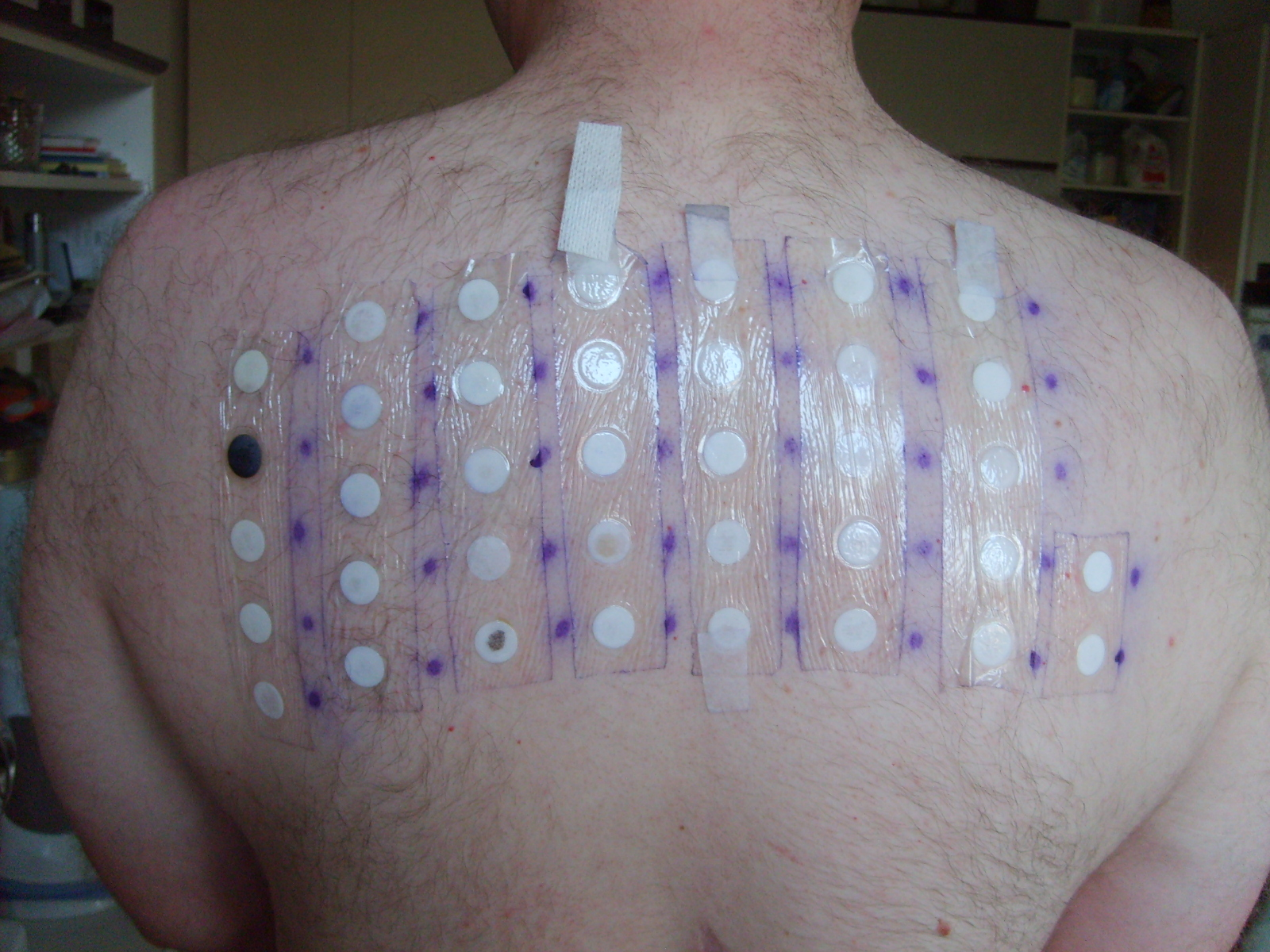
Patch test

Patch testing has been found to be helpful in the diagnosis of hand eczema.

== Treatment ==
Hand eczema is a complex condition, and treatment should only be administered by a dermatologist with specialist knowledge. Treatment may be very costly. Treatment should follow certain basic principles, and chronic and severe cases of hand eczema in particular require complex treatment concepts. Besides skin care, hand protection, and external (topical) applications with preparations containing effective ingredients or light therapy, an internal (systemic) therapy may be considered.

=== Avoidance of catalysts, basic procedures, and skin protection ===
Of primary importance is the strict removal and avoidance of catalysts for the development of chronic hand eczema, such as skin-irritating damage, excessive contact with water, or proven allergenic substances. Treatment of every type of hand eczema and degree of severity must include sustainable replenishment of the natural oils and moisture contained in the skin with creams and salves free of fragrances and preservatives; this is an essential basic step. In addition, protection procedures developed especially for the individual's skin stresses must be applied, e.g. use of cotton or hypoallergenic plastic gloves. Depending on the individual's own needs, these procedures should continue after the hand eczema heals, since they will also have a preventive effect.

=== External treatment ===
External treatment should be oriented primarily according to the prevailing signs of illness. In the case of blister forming, drying treatments such as hand baths containing synthetic tannins or oily-moist preparations may hinder itching. If callus development exhibiting tear formation is present, the focus should be on softening the skin with preparations containing urea or salicylic acid. In order to reduce inflammation, creams and salves containing cortisone are often very effective. Topical corticosteroids are a standard treatment for hand eczema, but their efficacy in comparison to UV phototherapy is not clear. Severe and chronic cases seldom respond sufficiently and require long periods of treatment which can increase the risk of side effects occurring. In individual cases, and especially in the case of atopic hand eczema, the dermatologist may prefer to use cortisone-free, anti-inflammatory creams or salves, which include calcineurin inhibitors tacrolimus or pimecrolimus. A 55 patient trial found topical bexarotene 1% gel monotherapy to be effective and well-tolerated (79% response rate for ≥50% clinical improvement; 39% response rate for ≥90% improvement).

=== Phototherapy ===
Phototherapy can be effective in the treatment of chronic hand eczema. However, not all dermatologists or dermatology clinics offer this form of therapy, and it involves extended periods of treatment for the patient. A period of four to six weeks should involve 3–4 radiation sessions. The most frequently applied form of light therapy is PUVA therapy. This first treats the hands with a cream that contains an ingredient that causes the skin to become light-sensitive, the hands are then irradiated with ultraviolet A light (UV-A). After two days of treatment, a pause of one day must occur. Due to possible risks such as premature skin aging or chronic light damage caused to the skin, phototherapy cannot be considered for the long term.

=== Systemic treatment ===
Besides skin care, skin protection, and an external treatment, severe and chronic cases of hand eczema often also require systemic treatment. Various preparations are available for this. For acute, severe episodes exhibiting blister formation, internal cortisone preparations, sometimes in combination with certain antibiotics, may be helpful in the short term. The active agent ciclosporin, which is approved for treatment of severely pronounced neurodermitis, may also be used for severe, atopic hand eczema. Other substances that suppress the immune system have also shown effectiveness in some cases. However, these substances are not approved for hand eczema.

In the last couple of years an internal medicine has been approved for the first time for the treatment of chronic hand eczema. This involves a derivative of vitamin A, called alitretinoin, which is also naturally present in the human body. Alitretinoin can be used to treat all forms of severe chronic hand eczema which have not reacted to external cortisone preparations. The effectiveness of this form of treatment has been tested extensively in clinical study programs and proven prior to its approval. The trial results showed that two thirds of patients did not have a recurrence 6 months after application of the medication, and that re-treatment is effective if hand eczema reoccurs. The duration of alitretinoin treatment is 3 to 6 months. During treatment and one month prior to beginning and one month after completion, women of childbearing-age must use contraceptives and also test for pregnancy each month since, as with all derivatives of vitamin A, the substance involved is teratogenic. Side effects mainly include temporary headaches during the initial days of treatment, as well as a possible increase in blood fat and cholesterol values. Regular laboratory tests of blood values are recommended to monitor this.

== Epidemiology ==
Hand eczema is a common condition: study data indicates a one-year prevalence of up to 10% in the general population. It is estimated that only 50–70% of people affected consult a doctor. The frequency of severe, chronic and recurrent forms of hand eczema is estimated at 5–7%. Approximately 2–4% of hand eczema patients also report that external (topical) therapy is insufficient.

Several factors adversely affect the long-term prognosis, including the development of the condition prior to the 20th birthday, the severity of initial manifestations, and eczema during childhood. Women, especially those under 30, are more frequently affected than men.

== See also ==
- Eczema
- Atopic dermatitis
- Contact dermatitis
- Phototherapy
