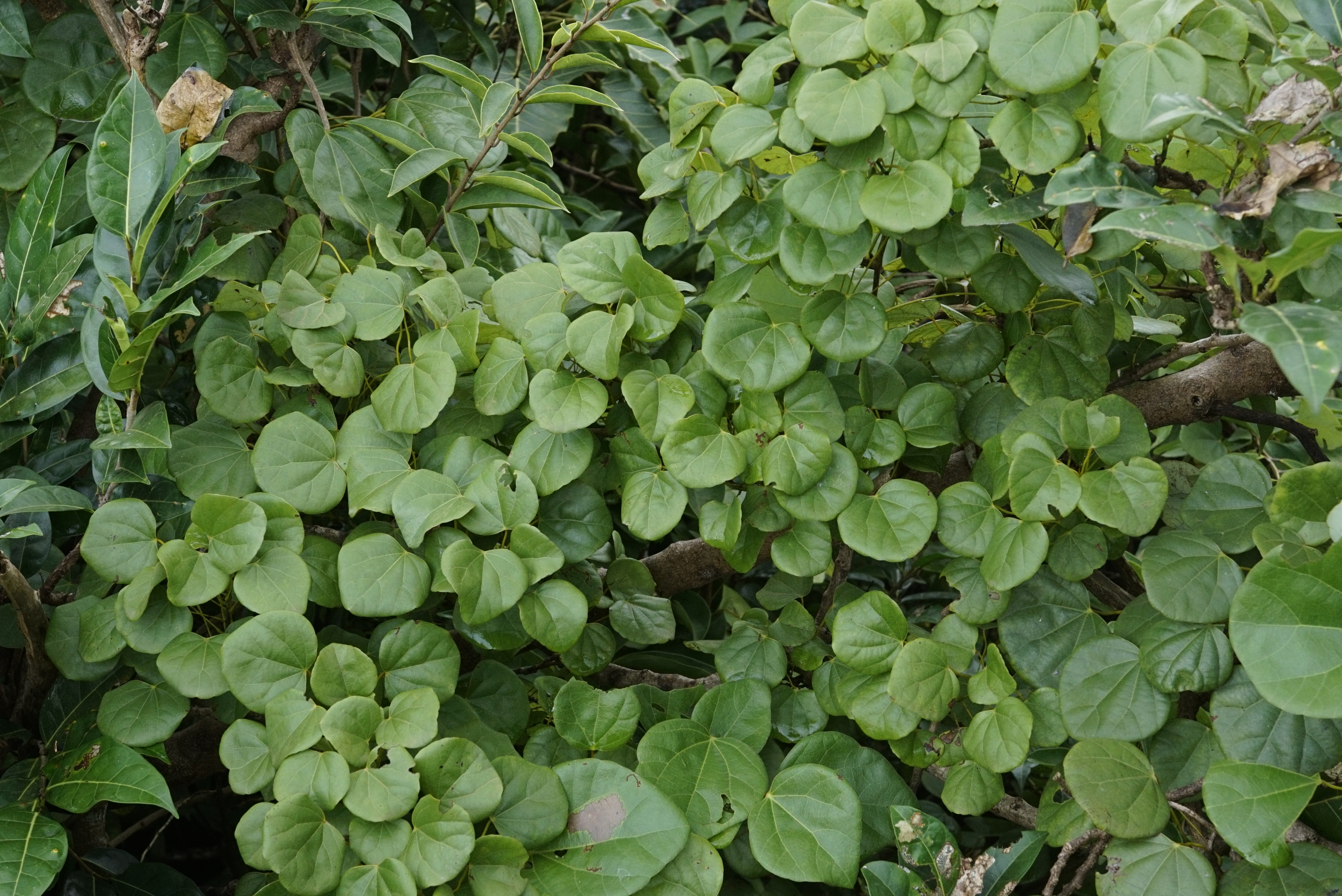
- Diploclisia glaucescens

Scientific classification
- Kingdom: Plantae
- Clade: Tracheophytes
- Clade: Angiosperms
- Clade: Eudicots
- Order: Ranunculales
- Family: Menispermaceae
- Genus: Diploclisia; Miers

Synonyms
- Heterotypic Synonyms: Quinio Schltdl.

= Diploclisia =

Genus of plants

Diploclisia is a genus of flowering plants belonging to the family Menispermaceae.

Its native range is the Andaman Islands, Bangladesh, Borneo, Cambodia, China, East Himalaya, Hainan, India, Java, Peninsular Malaysia, the Maluku Islands, Myanmar, New Guinea, the Nicobar Islands, the Philippines, Sri Lanka, Sulawesi, Sumatra, Thailand, and Vietnam.

== Species ==
Accepted species in the genus include:

- Diploclisia affinis (Oliv.) Diels
- Diploclisia glaucescens (Blume) Diels
