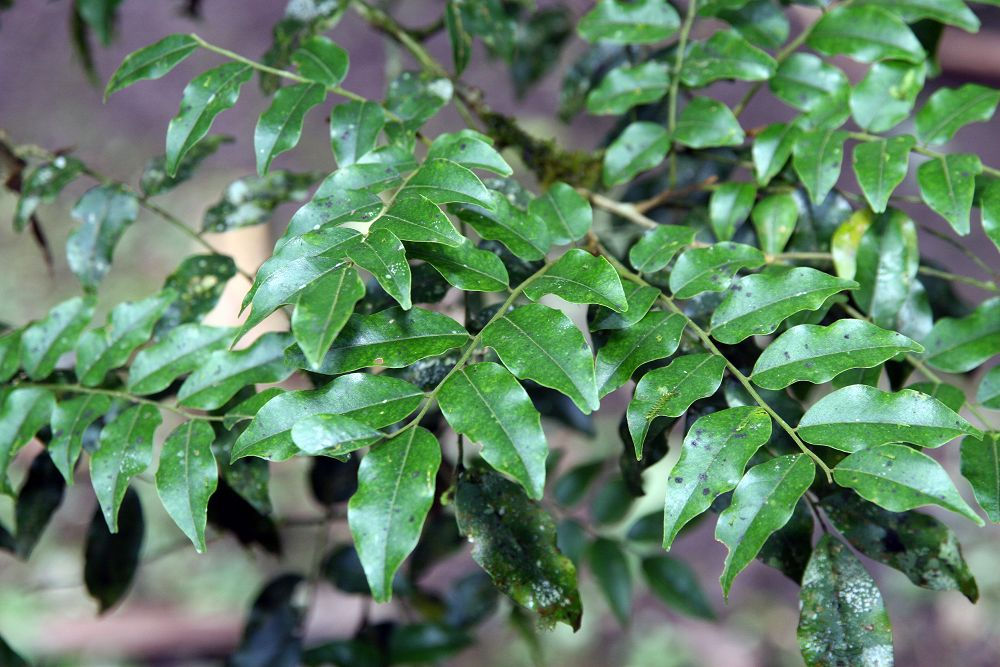

Conservation status
- Near Threatened (IUCN 3.1)

Scientific classification
- Kingdom: Plantae
- Clade: Tracheophytes
- Clade: Angiosperms
- Clade: Eudicots
- Clade: Rosids
- Order: Fabales
- Family: Fabaceae
- Subfamily: Faboideae
- Genus: Myroxylon
- Species: M. peruiferum

Binomial name
- Myroxylon peruiferum L.f.

Synonyms
- Myrospermum erythroxylum Allemão; Myrospermum pedicellatum Lam.; Myrospermum peruiferum (L. f.) DC.; Myrospermum pubescens (Kunth) DC.; Myroxylon pedicellatum (Lam.) Willd.; Myroxylon robiniaefolium Klotzsch; Myroxylon pubescens Kunth; Toluifera pedicellata (Lam.) Baill.; Toluifera peruifera (L. f.) Baill.; Toluifera pubescens (Kunth) Baill

= Myroxylon peruiferum =

Species of legume

Myroxylon peruiferum, or quina, is a species of tree in the family Fabaceae. It is native to tropical forests of North and South America.

There is some historical documentation that could indicate this tree was the original species used to produce the fever remedy known as Peruvian Bark or Jesuit's Bark, which was synthesized by Jesuit missionaries in the 1600s from their observations of indigenous healers working with local flora. This remedy later became connected to the cinchona tree, also native to Peru, Ecuador and Bolivia, which produces quinine, a natural alkaloid that is effective against malaria. The two trees are not in the same taxonomic order or family.

Some contemporary resources do point to other traditional medicinal uses of Myroxylon peruiferum among communities who are familiar with the species.
