= Benzyl benzoate =

Chemical compound

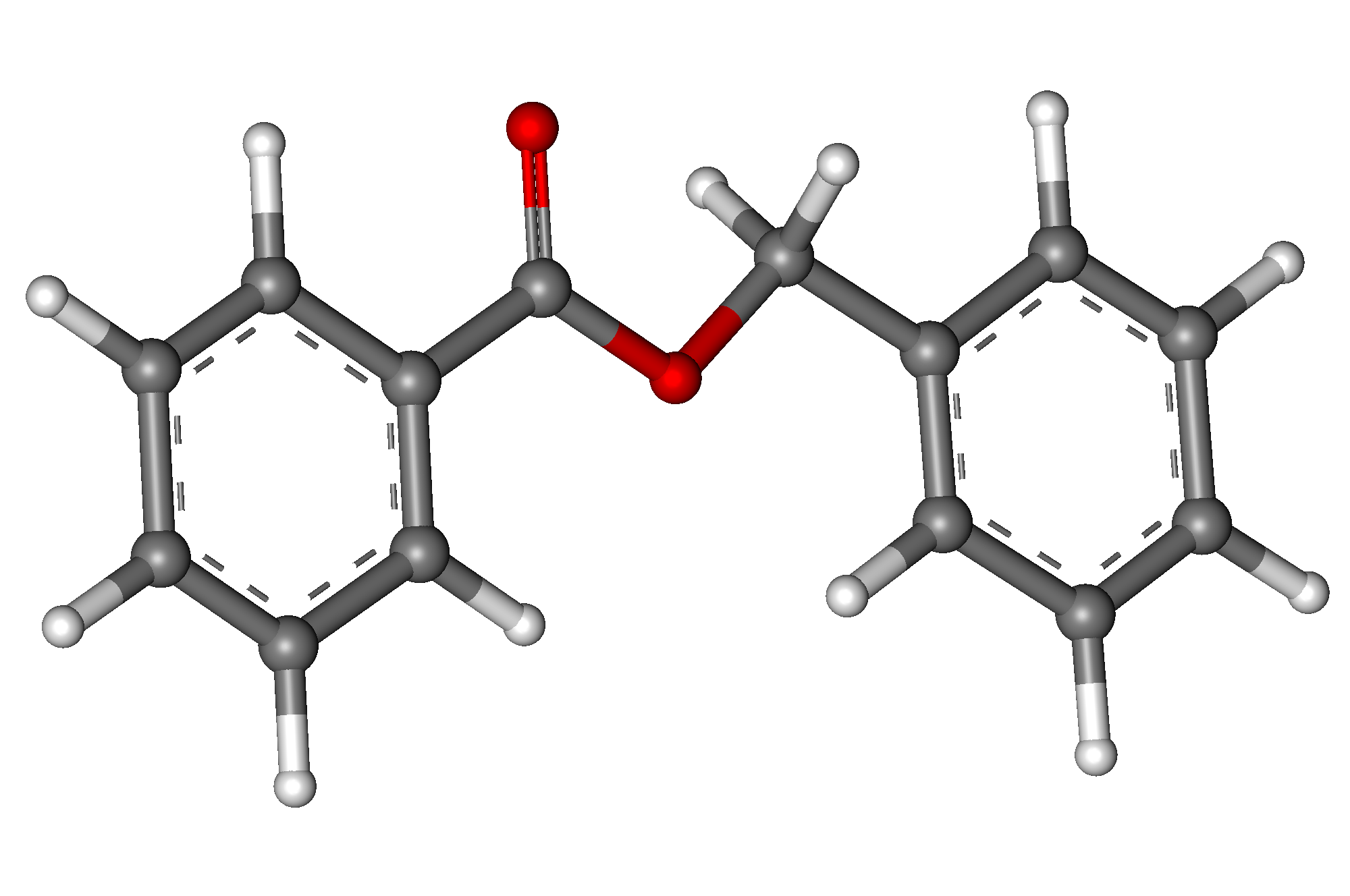

Clinical data
- Trade names: Ascabin, Ascabiol, Ascarbin, Tenutex, others
- Other names: Benzoic acid benzyl ester
- ATC code: P03AX01 (WHO) QP53AX11 (WHO)

Identifiers
- IUPAC name: Benzyl benzoate
- CAS Number: 120-51-4
- PubChem CID: 2345
- DrugBank: DB02775
- ChemSpider: 13856959
- UNII: N863NB338G
- KEGG: D01138
- ChEBI: CHEBI:41237
- ChEMBL: ChEMBL1239
- CompTox Dashboard (EPA): DTXSID8029153
- ECHA InfoCard: 100.004.003

Chemical and physical data
- Formula: C_{14}H_{12}O_{2}
- Molar mass: 212.248 g·mol^{−1}
- 3D model (JSmol): Interactive image
- Density: 1.118 g/cm^{3}
- Melting point: 21 °C (70 °F)
- Boiling point: 323–324 °C (613–615 °F)
- Solubility in water: 0.0153 mg/mL (20 °C)
- SMILES: O=C(OCc1ccccc1)c2ccccc2
- InChI: InChI=1S/C14H12O2/c15-14(13-9-5-2-6-10-13)16-11-12-7-3-1-4-8-12/h1-10H,11H2; Key:SESFRYSPDFLNCH-UHFFFAOYSA-N

Benzyl benzoate
Names
- IUPAC name Benzyl benzoate
- Other names: Benzoic acid benzyl ester

Identifiers
ECHA InfoCard	100.004.003
UNII	N863NB338G
CompTox Dashboard (EPA)	DTXSID8029153

Properties
Chemical formula	C_{14}H_{12}O_{2}
Molar mass	212.248 g·mol^{−1}
Appearance	Colorless oily liquid or white solid
Odor	Faint, sweet, balsamic
Density	1.118 g/cm^{3} at 20 °C
Melting point	17–20 °C (63–68 °F; 290–293 K)
Boiling point	323–324 °C (613–615 °F; 596–597 K)
Solubility in water	0.0153 g/l at 20 °C
Vapor pressure	1.33 hPa at 125 °C

Hazards
- GHS labelling
Pictograms	(GHS07: Exclamation mark) (GHS09: Environmental hazard)
Signal word	Warning
Hazard statements	H302, H411
Precautionary statements	P264, P270, P273, P301+P317, P330, P391, P501
Flash point	148 °C (298 °F; 421 K)
Autoignition temperature	480 °C (896 °F; 753 K)

Related compounds
Related compounds	Phenyl benzoate
- Except where otherwise noted, data are given for materials in their standard state (at 25 °C [77 °F], 100 kPa). Infobox references

Benzyl benzoate is an organic compound which is used as a medication and insect repellent. As a medication it is used to treat scabies and lice. For scabies either permethrin or malathion is typically preferred. It is applied to the skin as a lotion. Typically two to three applications are needed. It is also present in Balsam of Peru, Tolu balsam, and in a number of flowers.

Side effects may include irritation of the skin. It is not recommended in children. It is also used in other animals; however, it is considered toxic to cats. How it works is unclear.

Benzyl benzoate was first studied medically in 1918. It is on the World Health Organization's List of Essential Medicines. Benzyl benzoate is sold under the brand name Scabanca among others and is available as a generic medication. It is not available for medical use in the United States.

== Uses ==
=== Medical ===
Benzyl benzoate is an effective and inexpensive topical treatment for human scabies. It has vasodilating and spasmolytic effects and is present in many asthma and whooping cough drugs. It is also used as an excipient in some testosterone-replacement medications (like Nebido) for treating hypogonadism.

Benzyl benzoate is used as a topical acaricide, scabicide, and pediculicide in veterinary hospitals.

=== Non-medical ===
Benzyl benzoate is used as a repellent for chiggers, ticks, and mosquitoes. It is also used as a dye carrier, solvent for cellulose derivatives, plasticizer, and fixative in the perfume industry. Its aroma is described as mildly sweet, balsamic, oily, herbal, floral, and fruity.

== Side effects ==
Benzyl benzoate has low acute toxicity in laboratory animals. It is rapidly hydrolyzed to benzoic acid and benzyl alcohol. Benzyl alcohol is subsequently metabolized to benzoic acid. The conjugates of benzoic acid (hippuric acid and the glucuronide of benzoic acid) are rapidly eliminated in urine. When given in large doses to laboratory animals, benzyl benzoate can cause hyperexcitation, loss of coordination, ataxia, convulsions, and respiratory paralysis.

Benzyl benzoate can be a skin irritant when used as a topical scabicide. Overdose can result in blistering and hives or a rash can occur as an allergic reaction.

As an excipient in some testosterone-replacement injectable medications, benzyl benzoate has been reported as a cause of anaphylaxis in a case in Australia. Bayer includes this report in information for health professionals and recommends that physicians "should be aware of the potential for serious allergic reactions" to preparations of this type. In Australia, reports to ADRAC, which evaluates reports of adverse drug reactions for the Therapeutic Goods Administration, show several reports of allergic issues since the anaphylaxis case from 2011.

== Chemistry ==
It is an organic compound with the formula C_{6}H_{5}COOCH_{2}C_{6}H_{5}. It is the ester of benzyl alcohol and benzoic acid. It forms either a colorless viscous liquid or white solid flakes and has a weak, sweet-balsamic odor. It occurs in a number of blossoms (e. g. tuberose, hyacinth) and is a component of Balsam of Peru and Tolu balsam. Its vapor density relative to the air is 7.31.

== Production ==
Benzyl benzoate is produced industrially by the reaction of sodium benzoate with benzyl chloride in the presence of a base, or by transesterification of methyl benzoate and benzyl alcohol. It is a byproduct of benzoic acid synthesis by toluene oxidation. It can also be synthesized by the Tishchenko reaction, using benzaldehyde with sodium benzyloxide (generated from sodium and benzyl alcohol) as catalyst:
