= Tolu balsam =

Type of tree balsam

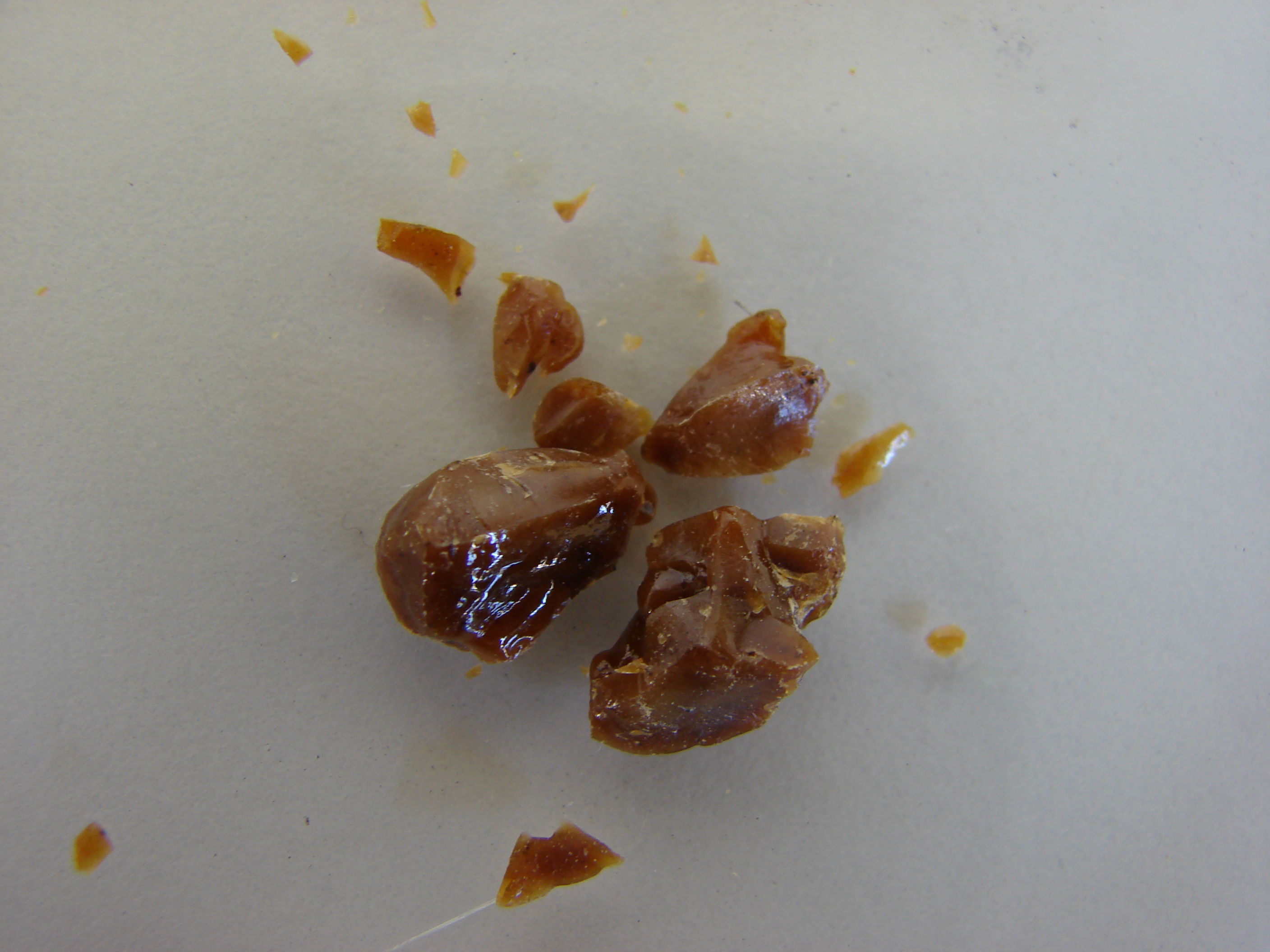
Balsam of Tolu

Tolu balsam or balsam of Tolu is a balsam that originates from South America (Colombia, Peru, Venezuela). It is similar to (and frequently confounded with) the balsam of Peru.

It is tapped from the living trunks of Myroxylon balsamum var. balsamum. The fresh balsam of Tolu is a brownish, sticky, semifluid mass. It gradually becomes a brittle solid, but softens again when it is warm. The balsam contains a fairly large amount of benzyl benzoate and benzyl cinnamate.

== Collection ==
Balsam of Tolu is obtained by cutting a V-shaped wound on the trunk of Myroxylon balsamum var. balsamum and fixing a calabash there to catch the exuded resin.

== Uses ==
The resin is still used in certain cough syrup formulas. However its main use in the modern era is in perfumery, where it is valued for its warm, mellow yet somewhat spicy scent.

It is also used as a natural remedy for skin rashes. It is a well known cause of contact dermatitis, a form of skin allergy.

== History ==
In 1841, Henri Étienne Sainte-Claire Deville isolated toluene by the dry distillation of tolu balsam. The resin is used in traditional medicine by the people of Central America and South America. It got its name because it was shipped to Europe from Tolú, Colombia. In 1753 Linnaeus described the type specimen of Toluifera balsamum (the synonym of Myroxylon balsamum) using a specimen collected in the province of Cartagena, probably a town called Tolú (which at the time was located in that province), and named it Toluifera balsamum in relation to the place of collection. The name of the important hydrocarbon solvent toluene is thus derived from Tolu balsam.
