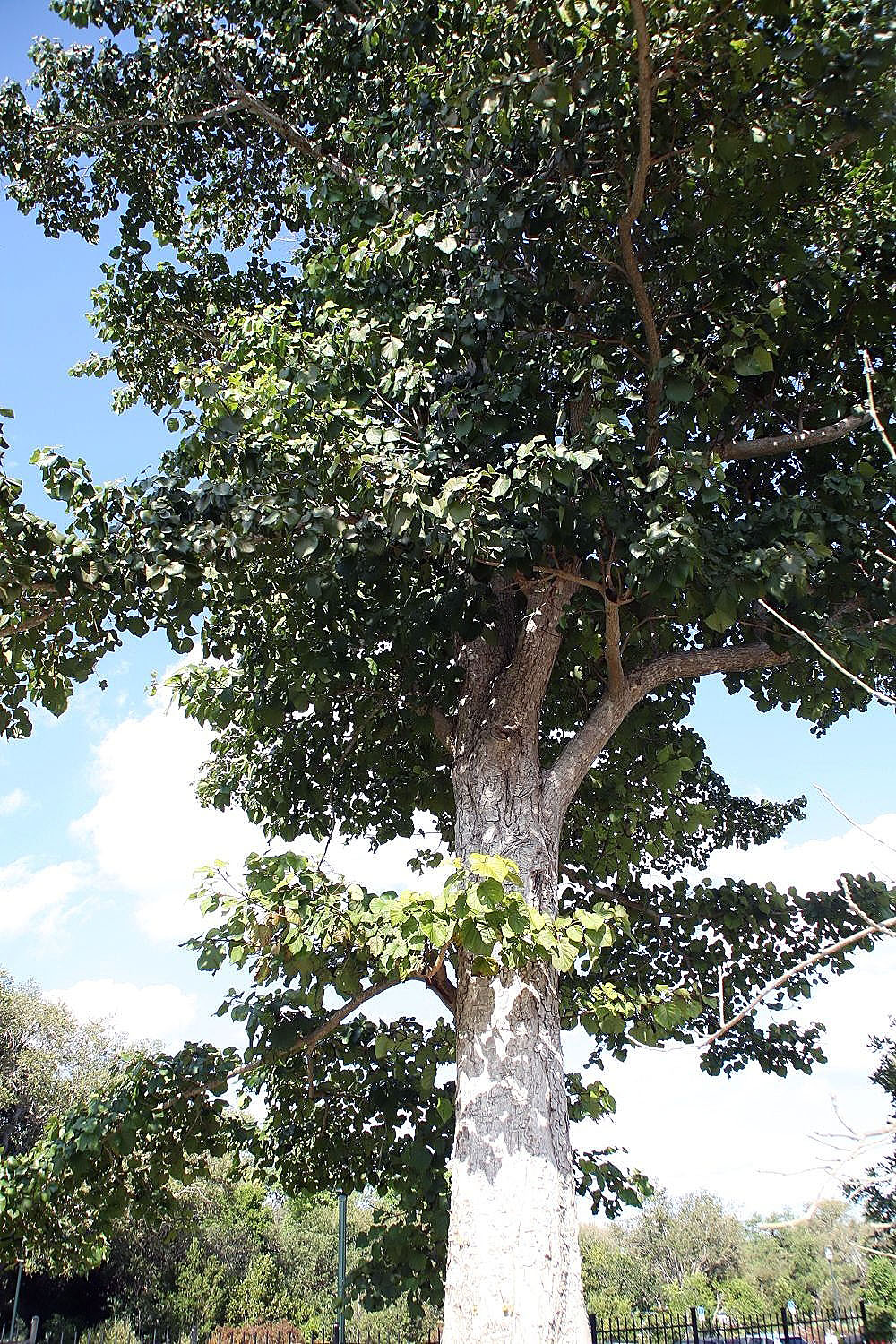
- In Fairchild Tropical Botanic Garden, Florida

Scientific classification
- Kingdom: Plantae
- Clade: Tracheophytes
- Clade: Angiosperms
- Clade: Eudicots
- Clade: Asterids
- Order: Gentianales
- Family: Rubiaceae
- Genus: Adina
- Species: A. cordifolia

Binomial name
- Adina cordifolia (Roxb.) Brandis

Synonyms
- Haldina cordifolia (Roxb.) Ridsdale; Nauclea cordifolia Roxb.; Nauclea sterculiifolia A.Rich. ex DC.

= Adina cordifolia =

Species of flowering plant

Adina cordifolia, synonym Haldina cordifolia, is a flowering plant in the family Rubiaceae. It is native to southern Asia, from India east to China and Vietnam and south to Peninsular Malaysia.

Adina cordifolia is a deciduous tree that can grow well over 20 metres high. The flowers may be insignificant individually but can be seen as attractive when they bloom together in inflorescences with a circumference of 20–30 mm. They are usually yellow often tinged with a shade of pink. A. cordifolia usually blossoms during winter (dry season) months. The bark of the tree acts as an antiseptic.

== Gallery ==
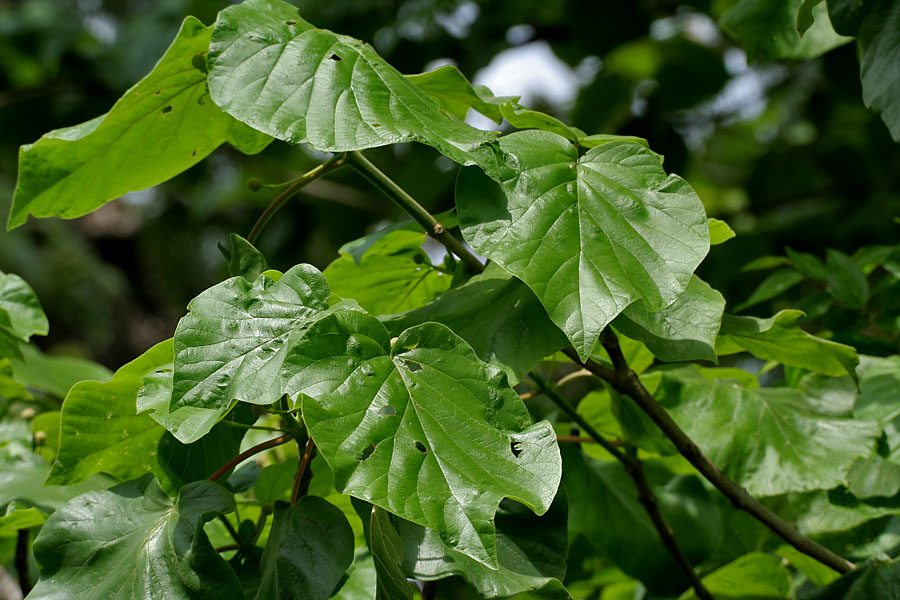
At Ananthagiri Hills, Andhra Pradesh, India

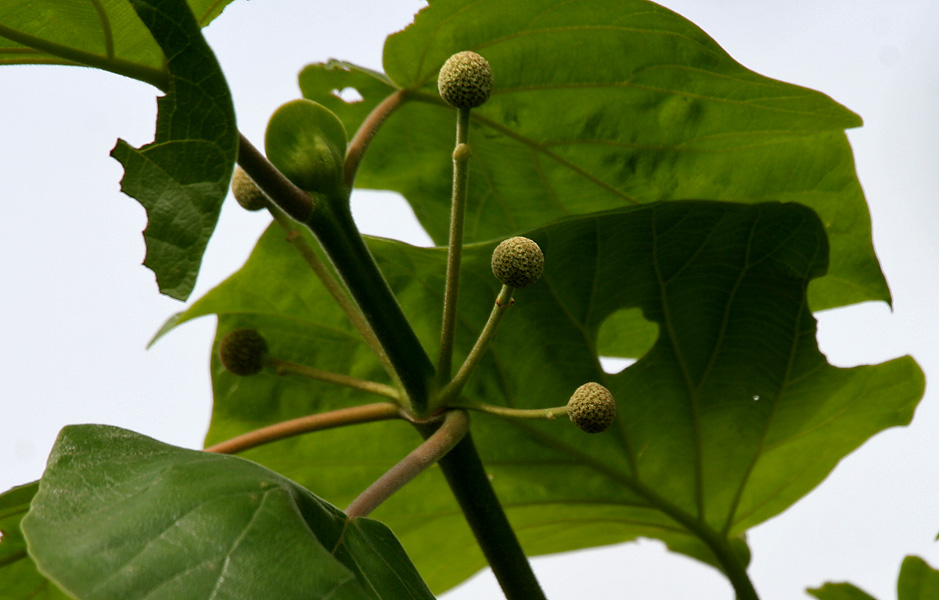
At Ananthagiri Hills, India

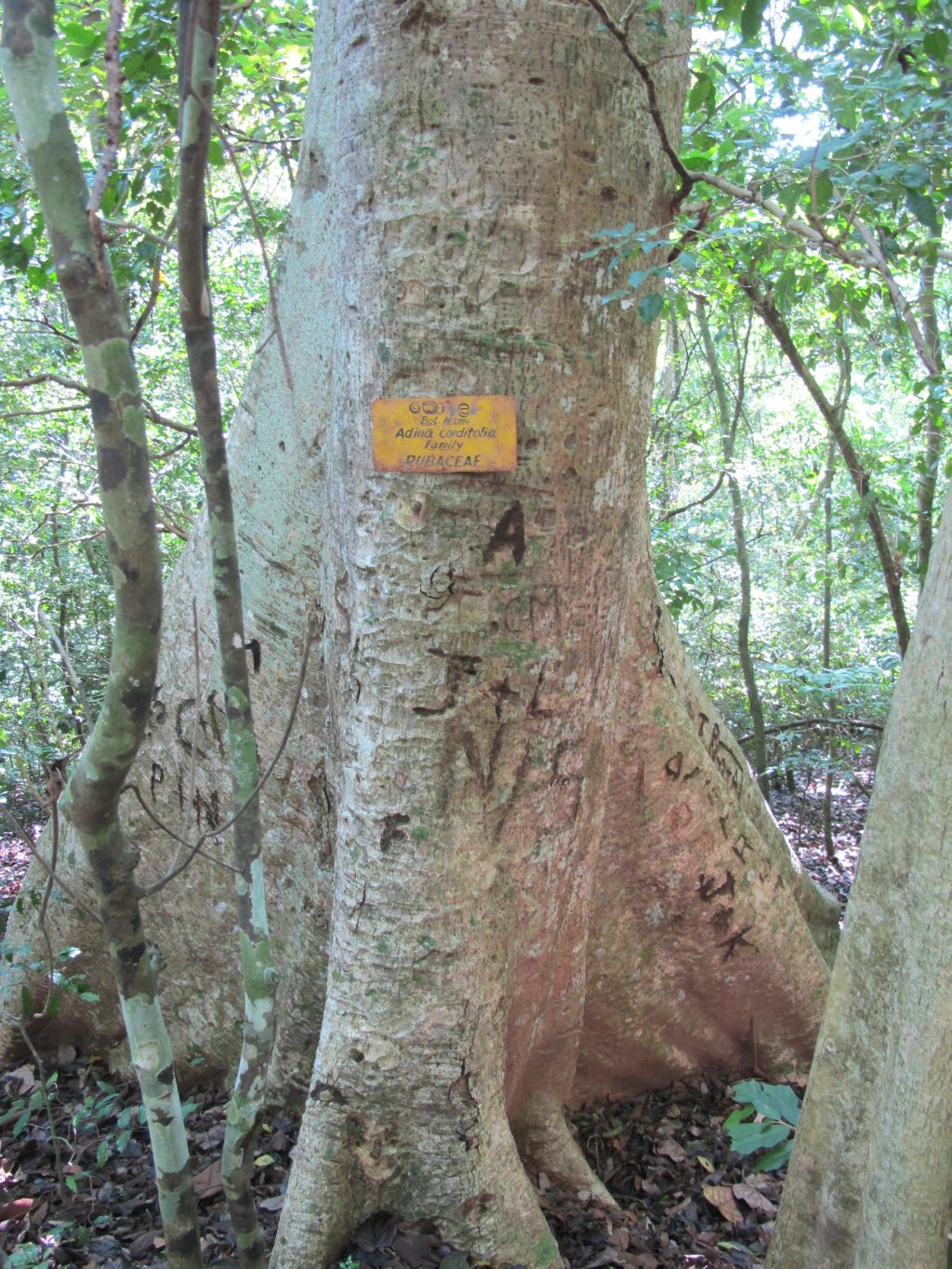
Trunk at Udawatta Kele Sanctuary, Sri Lanka

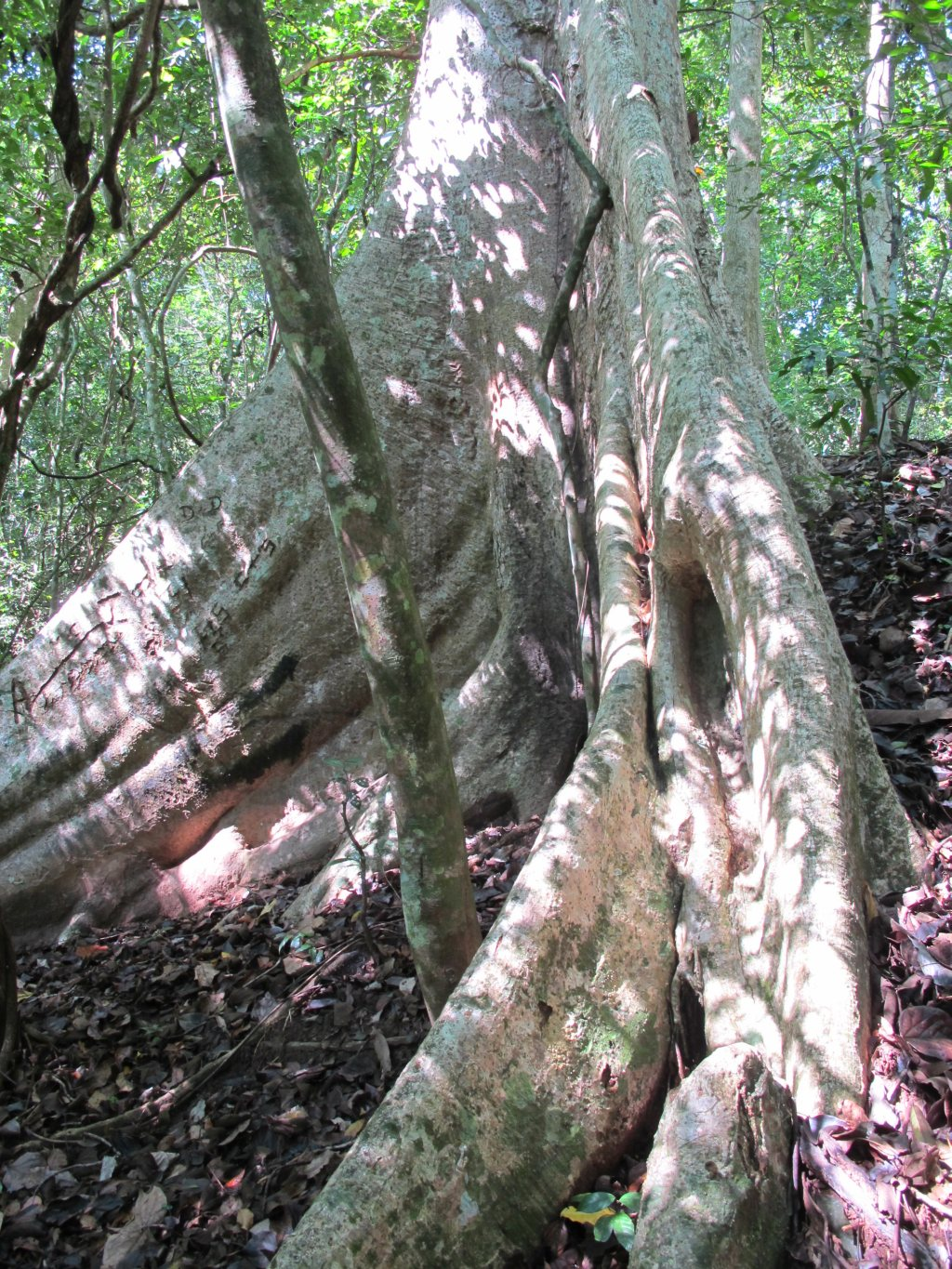
Trunk at Udawatta Kele Sanctuary, Sri Lanka
