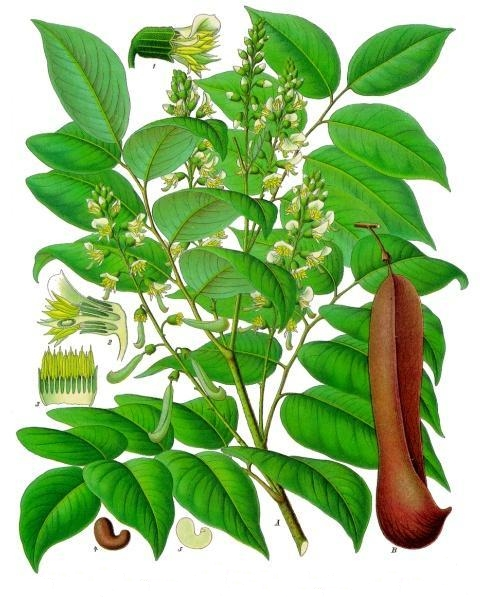
- Myroxylon balsamum from Koehler's Medicinal-Plants (1887)

Scientific classification
- Kingdom: Plantae
- Clade: Tracheophytes
- Clade: Angiosperms
- Clade: Eudicots
- Clade: Rosids
- Order: Fabales
- Family: Fabaceae
- Subfamily: Faboideae
- Tribe: Amburaneae
- Genus: Myroxylon; L.f. (1782), nom. cons.

Species
- Myroxylon balsamum (L.) Harms; Myroxylon peruiferum L. f.

Synonyms
- Myroxylon J. R. Forst. & G. Forst.; Toluifera L. (1753)

= Myroxylon =

Genus of legumes

Myroxylon is a genus of Fabaceae native to Latin America.

== History ==
The first described species in this genus was M. balsamum. It was originally described in 1753 by Linnaeus as Toluifera balsamum, based on a specimen collected in the province of Cartagena (at the time Tolú was located in the province of Cartagena). The genus Myroxylon was first established by Linnaeus filius in 1781, when he described M. peruiferum based on a specimen collected by Mutis in South America. Although Toluifera is prior in term of publication time, Myroxylon is chosen as the conserved name and Toluifera is rejected. The name derives from Greek μύρρα (myrrha, "myrrh") and ξύλον (xylon, "wood").

== Species ==
Some authors recognize infra-specific taxa based, mainly, in their balsam phytochemistry; while other authors do not recognize such categories. There are reports of differences in composition of balsams obtained from M. balsamum var. balsamum (Tolu balsam tree), M. balsamum var. pereirae (Peru balsam tree), and M. peruiferum (quina).

It is in the flowering plant family Fabaceae (Leguminosae). There are two species:

Image	Bark	Scientific name	Common name	Distribution	Elevation (m)
		Myroxylon balsamum	Santos Mahogany, Cabreuva	Southern Mexico and Central and South America	200–690 m
		Myroxylon peruiferum	Quina	Southern Mexico and Central and South America	540–2000 m

== Distribution ==
Myroxylon species grow in Central America (primarily in El Salvador) and South America.

Myroxylon balsamum occurs in Central America, and northern and western South America, it is fairly common in tropical forest at 200–690 m elevation. In Peru and Brazil this species is mostly associated with rivers, and sometimes grows on lateritic soil. It is found in remnants of mesophillous forest. At present it is considered as being of least concern (LC) according to CITES classification. Myroxylon peruiferum is disjunctly distributed in the Americas, from Mexico to northern Argentina and southern Brazil, though it has a wide distribution, it is not abundant within its area of occurrence. It is found in remnants of mesophillous forest and dry habitats at 540–2000 m elevation. It is considered to be Near Threatened (NT), according to CITES classification.

== The tree ==
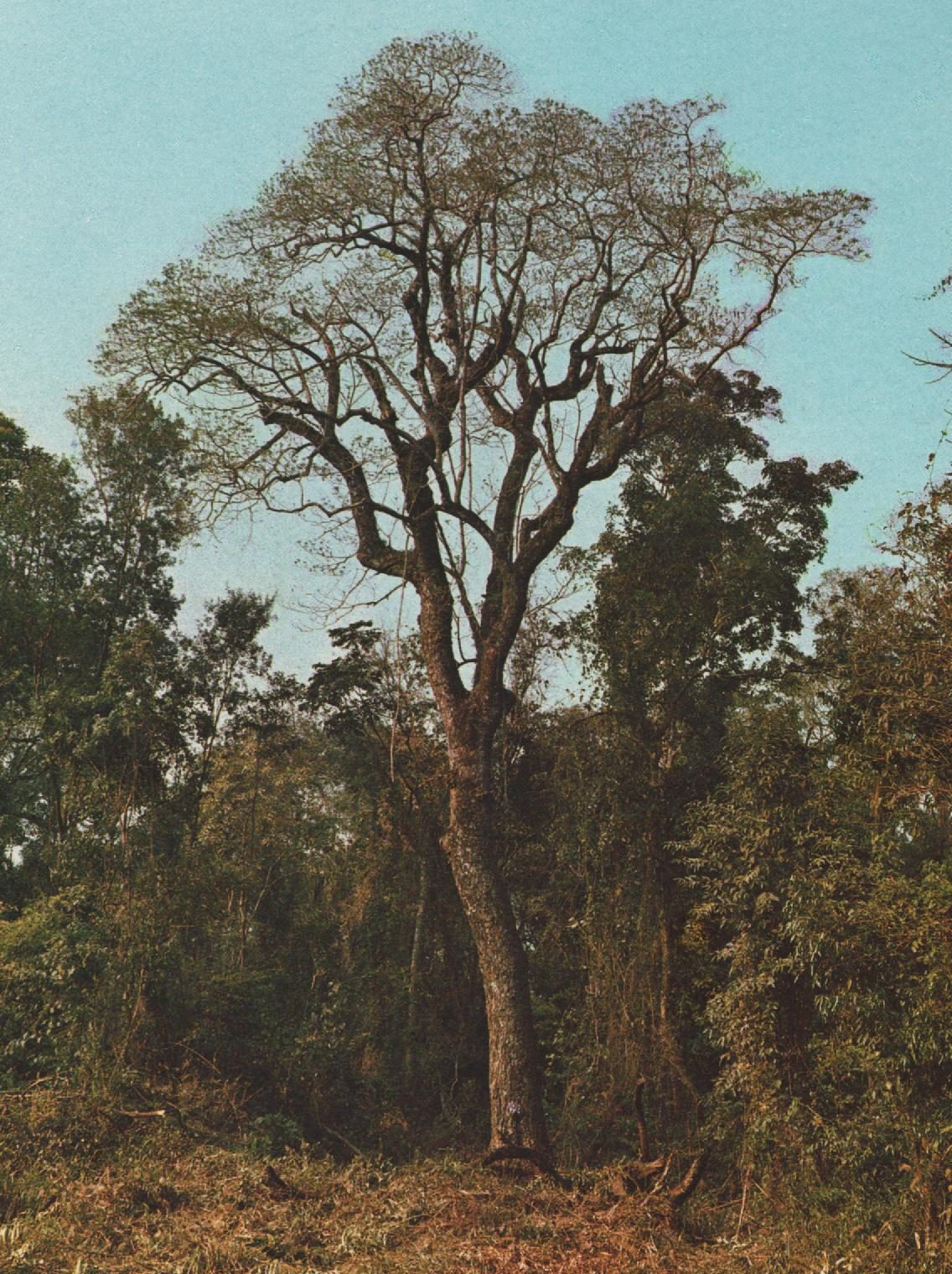
Myroxylon peruiferum

The trees are large, growing to 40 metres (130 ft) tall, with evergreen pinnate leaves 15 centimetres (5.9 in) long, with 5–13 leaflets. The flowers are white with yellow stamens, produced in racemes. The fruit is a pod 7–11 centimetres (2.8–4.3 in) long, containing a single seed. The tree is often called Quina or Balsamo, Tolu in Colombia, Quina quina in Argentina, and sometimes Santos Mahogany or Cabreuva in the lumber trade.

Members of this genus produce hydroxypipecolic acids in their leaves.

The wood is dark brown, with a deep red heartwood. Natural oils grant it excellent decay resistance. In fact, it is also resistant to preservative treatment. Its specific gravity is 0.74–0.81.

With regard to woodworking, the tree is moderately difficult to work but can be finished with a high natural polish; it tends to cause some tool dulling.

== Invasive species ==
The balsam tree can become a highly invasive species when introduced into tropical countries where it is not native. In Sri Lanka, it has overgrown several hectares of the Udawatta Kele Sanctuary and is rapidly spreading there. In this Sri Lankan rain forest, Myroxylon seeds sprout in very high numbers due to tolerating more diverse light conditions than native species and due to the absence of natural enemies such as diseases and insects. This has given rise to dense stands of young trees where no other vegetation can grow, causing severe ecological disruption, i.e., the disappearance of local, native plant species and consequently of the animals and insects that feed on these.

The tree has also been introduced to several Pacific islands such as Fiji and to Indonesia, and is a potential ecological threat there.
