= Phenyl benzoate =

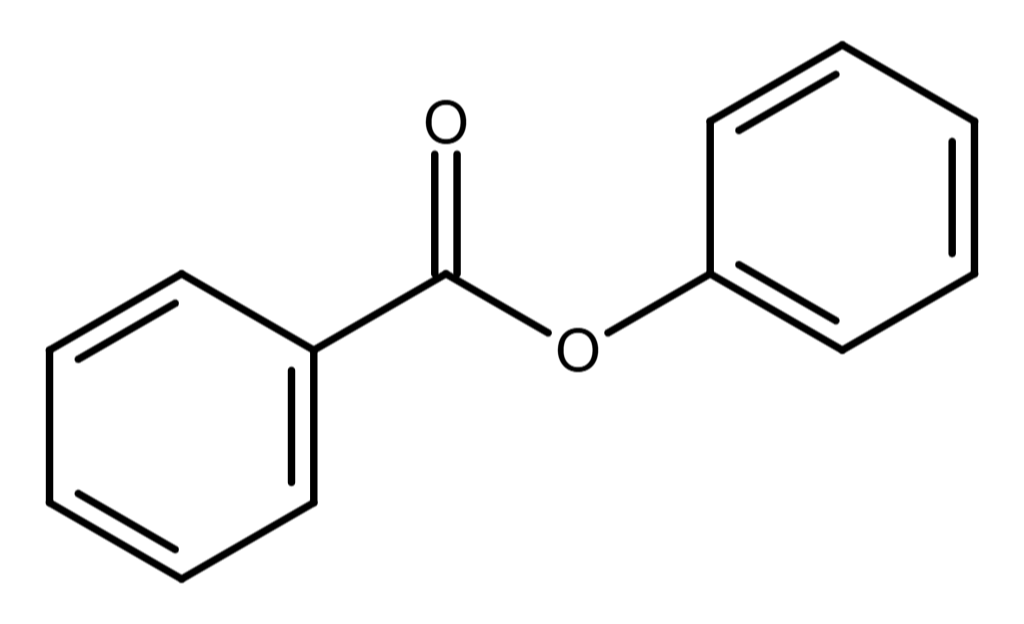

Names
- IUPAC name Phenyl benzoate
- Other names: Benzoic acid phenyl ester

Identifiers
CAS Number	93-99-2
3D model (JSmol)	Interactive image
ChEBI	CHEBI:86919
ChEMBL	ChEMBL1885870
ChemSpider	6901
ECHA InfoCard	100.002.086
EC Number	202-293-2
PubChem CID	7169
UNII	B8A3WVZ590
CompTox Dashboard (EPA)	DTXSID0048210
- InChI: InChI=1S/C13H10O2/c14-13(11-7-3-1-4-8-11)15-12-9-5-2-6-10-12/h1-10H Key: FCJSHPDYVMKCHI-UHFFFAOYSA-N
- SMILES: C1=CC=C(C=C1)C(=O)OC2=CC=CC=C2

Properties
Chemical formula	C_{6}H_{5}COOC_{6}H_{5}
Molar mass	198.221 g·mol^{−1}
Appearance	White crystalline solid
Odor	Geranium
Density	1.235 g/cm^{3}
Melting point	68–70 °C (154–158 °F; 341–343 K)
Boiling point	298–299 °C (568–570 °F; 571–572 K)
Solubility in water	Insoluble
Solubility	Soluble in ethanol, diethyl ether and chloroform.
Refractive index (n_{D})	1.5954 (estimate)

Hazards
- Occupational safety and health (OHS/OSH)
Main hazards	May cause irritation of the skin and serious irritation of the eyes
- GHS labelling
Pictograms	(GHS07: Exclamation mark)
Signal word	Warning
Hazard statements	H302, H315, H317, H319
Precautionary statements	P261, P264, P270, P272, P280, P301+P317, P302+P352, P321, P330, P333+P317, P362+P364, P501
- Lethal dose or concentration (LD, LC)
LD_{50} (median dose)	1225 mg/kg (mouse, oral)

Related compounds
Related compounds	Benzyl benzoate
- Except where otherwise noted, data are given for materials in their standard state (at 25 °C [77 °F], 100 kPa). Infobox references

Phenyl benzoate is an organic compound with the chemical formula C_{6}H_{5}COOC_{6}H_{5}, often abbreviated as PhCOOPh, where Ph stands for phenyl. It is a white crystalline solid, with odor of geranium. It is the phenyl ester of benzoic acid. It can be obtained by the formal condensation of phenol with benzoic acid.

== Synthesis ==
Phenyl benzoate can be synthesized in good yield by the reaction between benzoyl chloride and phenol in basic conditions, for example using sodium hydroxide as a catalyst.

C_{6}H_{5}COCl + C_{6}H_{5}OHC_{6}H_{5}COOC_{6}H_{5} + HCl

It can be sinthesized by the reaction of the same reactants, but using quaternary ammonium salts or tertiary amines as catalysts, using polar organic solvents such as dichloromethane and chlorobenzene. Using nonpolar organic solvents, such as n-hexane, benzene and toluene, causes the reaction rate to become slower overall. The order of catalytic activity for various quaternary ammonium salts as catalysts is benzyltributylammonium bromide > tetrabutylammonium hydrogensulfate > tetrabutylammonium bromide > benzyltriethylammonium chloride. The order of catalytic activity for various tertiary amines as catalysts is alkyldimethylamine > triethylamine > tributylamine > trimethylamine. The order of effectiveness of organic solvents is dichloromethane > n-hexane > chlorobenzene > toluene.

== Structure ==
Relative orientation of the benzene rings in phenyl benzoate's molecule varies with phase state and temperature.

== Uses ==
Phenyl benzoate is used in cosmetics as a preservative. It is a key reagent in the synthesis of soluble polyimides using dianhydride and diamine derivatives. Some phenyl benzoate derivatives possessing a terminal hydroxyl group shows anticancer behavior.
