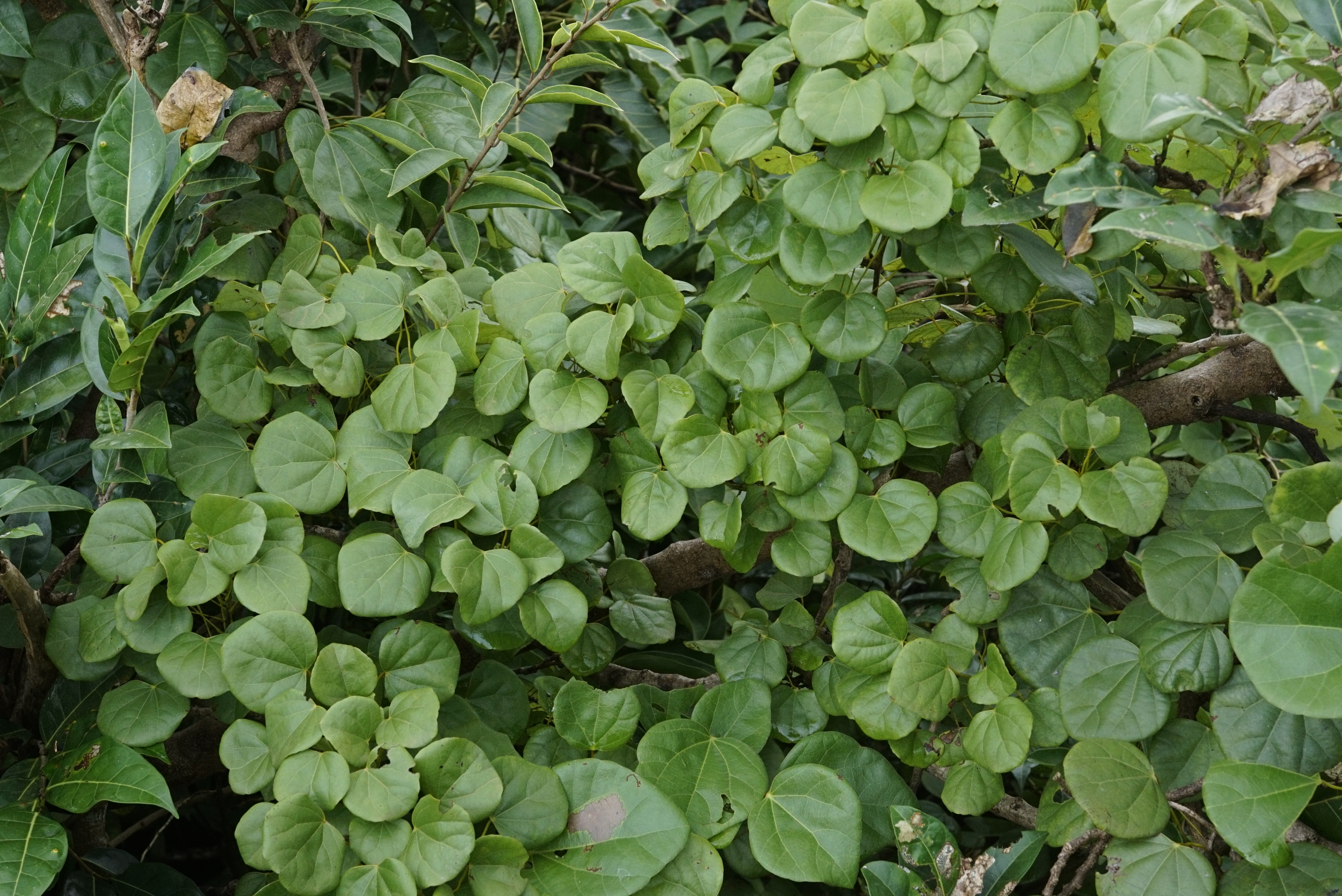

Scientific classification
- Kingdom: Plantae
- Clade: Tracheophytes
- Clade: Angiosperms
- Clade: Eudicots
- Order: Ranunculales
- Family: Menispermaceae
- Genus: Diploclisia
- Species: D. glaucescens

Binomial name
- Diploclisia glaucescens (Blume) Diels

Synonyms
- Cocculus glaucescens Blume

= Diploclisia glaucescens =

Species of flowering plant

Diploclisia glaucescens is a species of flowering plant. It is an extensively spreading climber found in South Asia, Southeast Asia, China, Indonesia and the Philippines.
