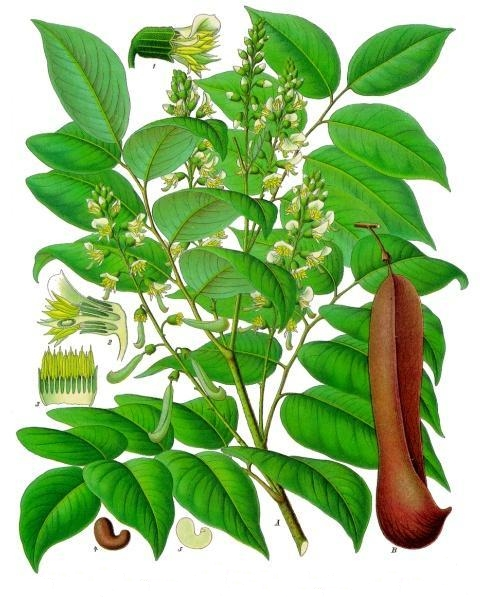
- Tolu balsam tree Myroxylon balsamum var. balsamum
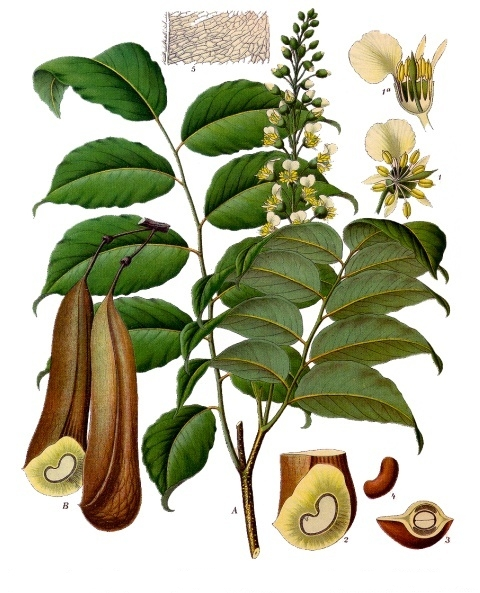
- Peru balsam tree Myroxylon balsamum var. pereirae

Conservation status
- Least Concern (IUCN 3.1)

Scientific classification
- Kingdom: Plantae
- Clade: Tracheophytes
- Clade: Angiosperms
- Clade: Eudicots
- Clade: Rosids
- Order: Fabales
- Family: Fabaceae
- Subfamily: Faboideae
- Genus: Myroxylon
- Species: M. balsamum

Binomial name
- Myroxylon balsamum (L.) Harms

Synonyms
- Myrospermum balsamiferum Ruiz & Pavon apud Lopez; Myrospermum pereirae Royle; Myrospermum punctatum (Klotzsch) Walp.; Myrospermum sonsonatense Oerst.; Myrospermum toluifera (Kunth) DC.; Myroxylon balsamum var. balsamum; Myroxylon balsamum var. pereirae (Royle) Harms; Myroxylon balsamum var. punctatum (Klotzsch) Harms; Myroxylon hanburyanum Klotzsch; Myroxylon pereirae (Royle) Klotzsch; Myroxylon punctatum Klotzsch; Myroxylon toluifera Kunth; Myroxylon toluiferum A.Rich.; Toluifera balsamum L.; Toluifera balsamum Baill. var. balsamum; Toluifera balsamum var. pereirae (Royle) Baill.; Toluifera pereirae (Royle) Baill.; Toluifera balsamum var. punctata Baill

= Myroxylon balsamum =

Species of legume

Myroxylon balsamum, is a species of tree in the family Fabaceae. It is known by the common name Santos mahogany or Cabrueva. It is native to tropical forests from Southern Mexico through the Amazon regions of Peru and Brazil at elevations of 200–690 metres (660–2,260 ft). Plants are found growing in well drained soil in evergreen humid forest.

== Varieties ==
According to the Germplasm Resources Information Network, there are two varieties:

- Myroxylon balsamum var. balsamum – Tolu balsam tree
- Myroxylon balsamum var. pereirae (Royle) Harms – Peru balsam tree

== Description ==
The tree is large and slow growing, reaching 45 metres (148 ft) in height. Crown is round with dense foliage and the bark is yellowish with a pungent odor. Leaves alternate, petiolate, 8–20 centimetres (3–8 in) including the petioles, the petioles 1–4 centimetres (1/2–1 1/2 in) long, and the rachis 5–15 centimetres (2–6 in) long. The rachis and petioles are pubescent and terete. Leaflets are acute to acuminate at the apex, obtuse at the base, glabrous, with an entire margin and glandular oil dots.

Plants bloom 5 years from seeds during the months of February to June. Flowers are white, pubescent and has around 10 stamens. The fruit is a flat winged pod, narrowly obovate 8 centimetres (3 1/4 in) long 1–2 centimetres (3/8–3/4 in) wide, yellow to brown when dried and drop around November to January.

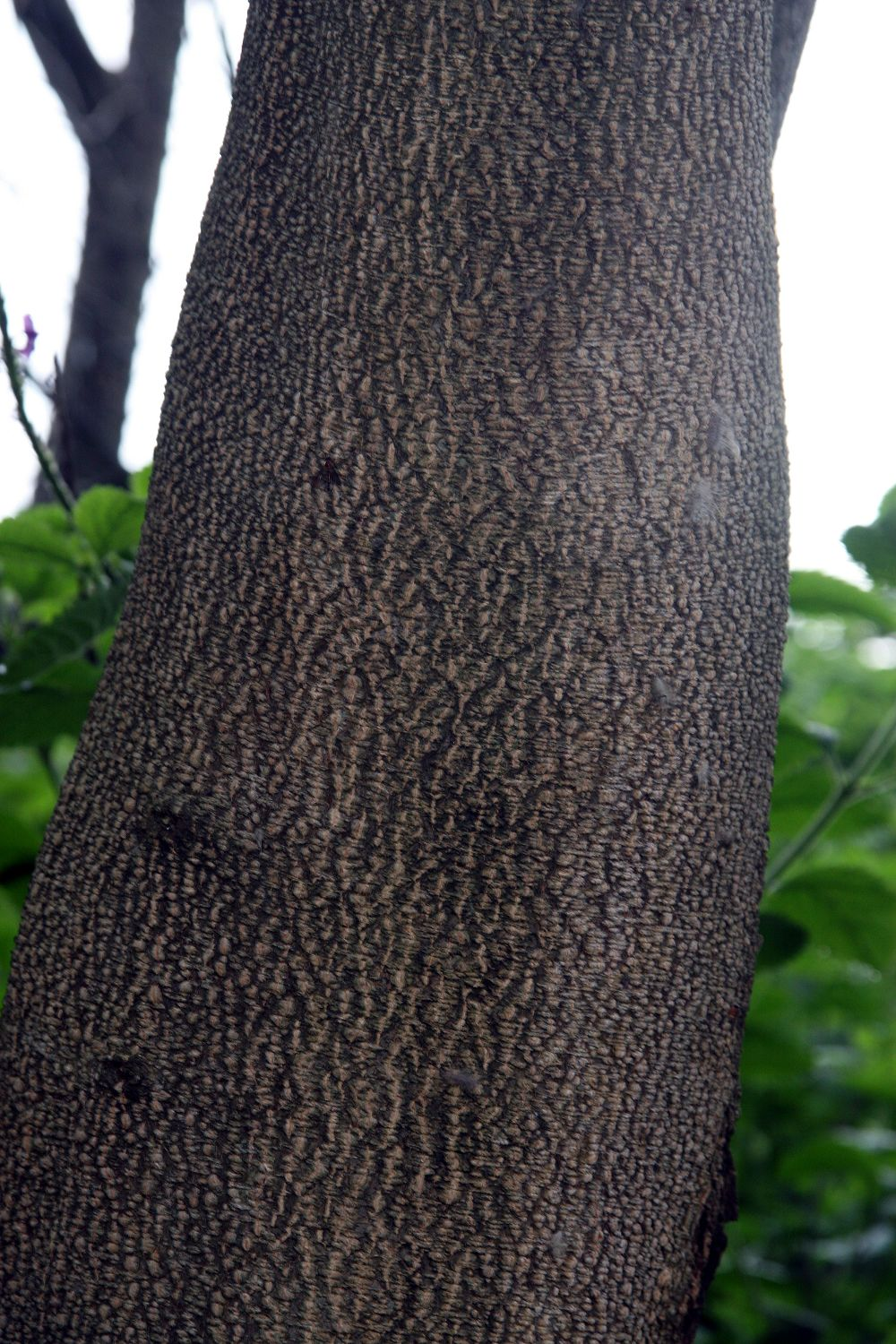
Trunk

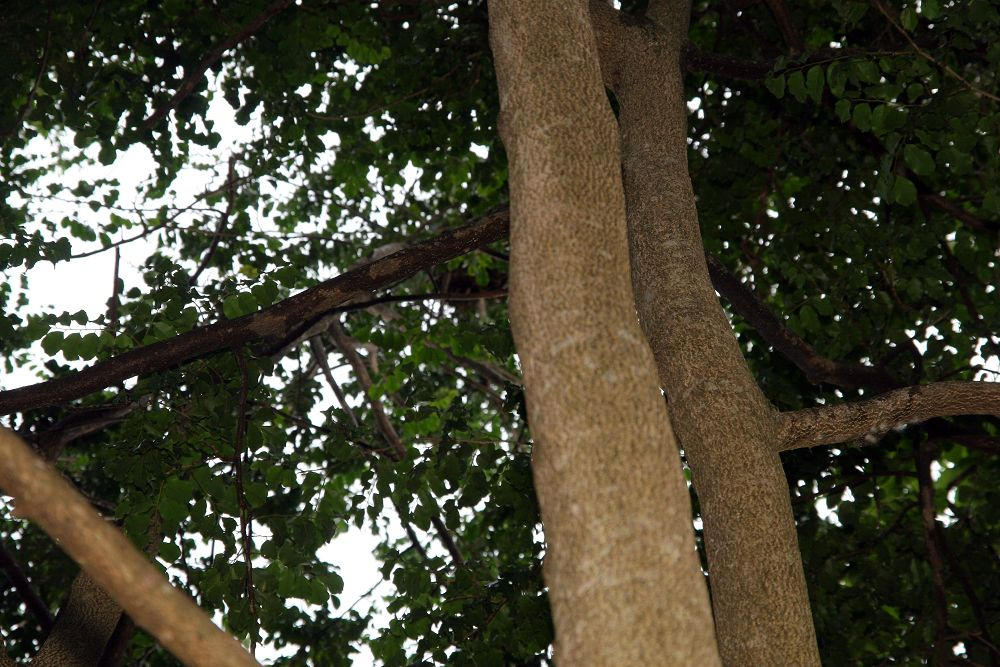
Limbs

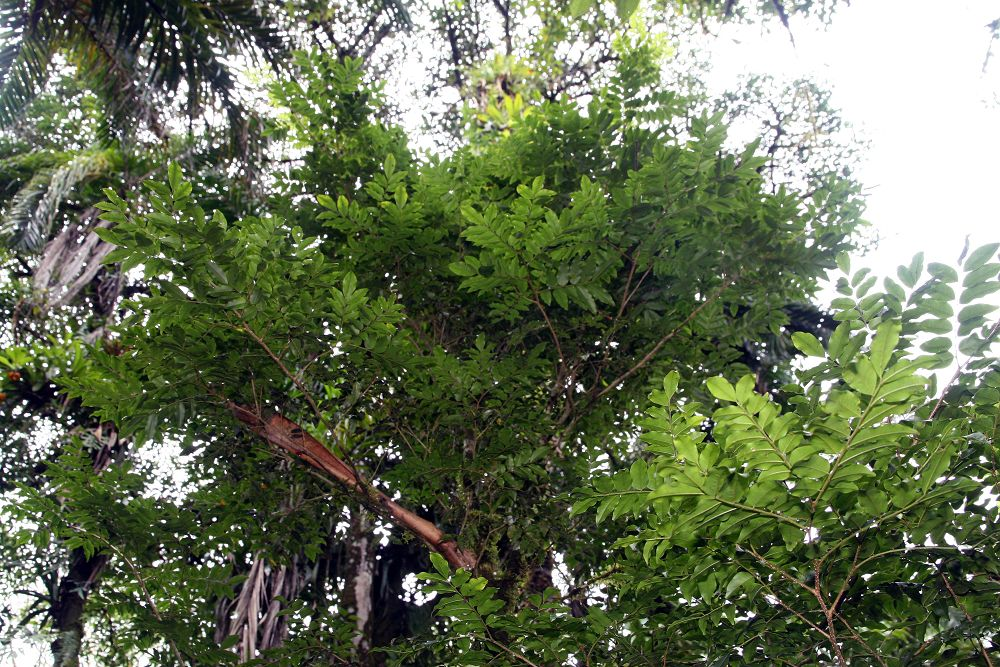
Leaves

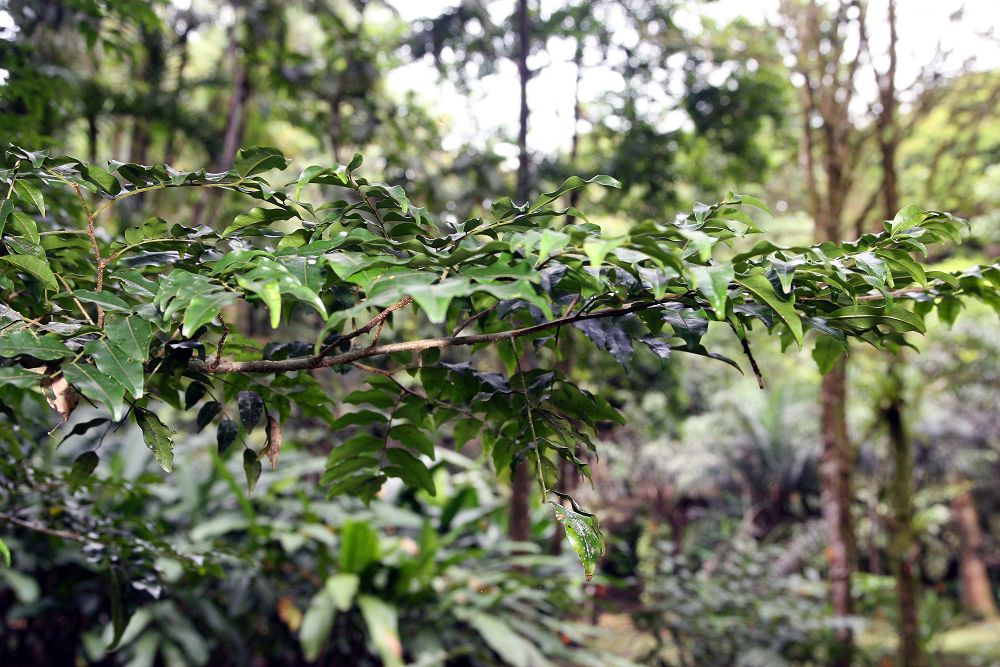
Leaves

== Uses ==
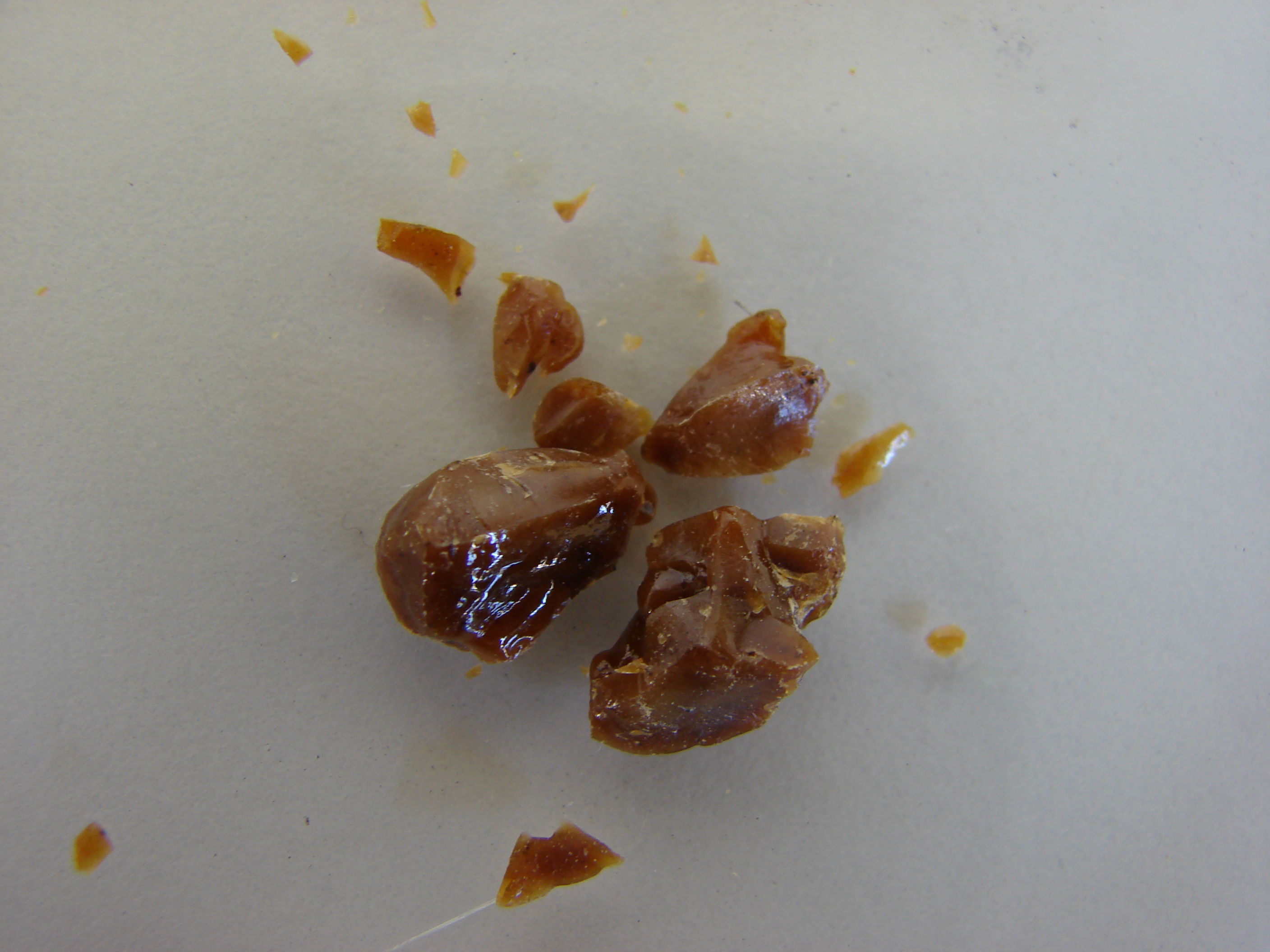
Balsam of Tolu

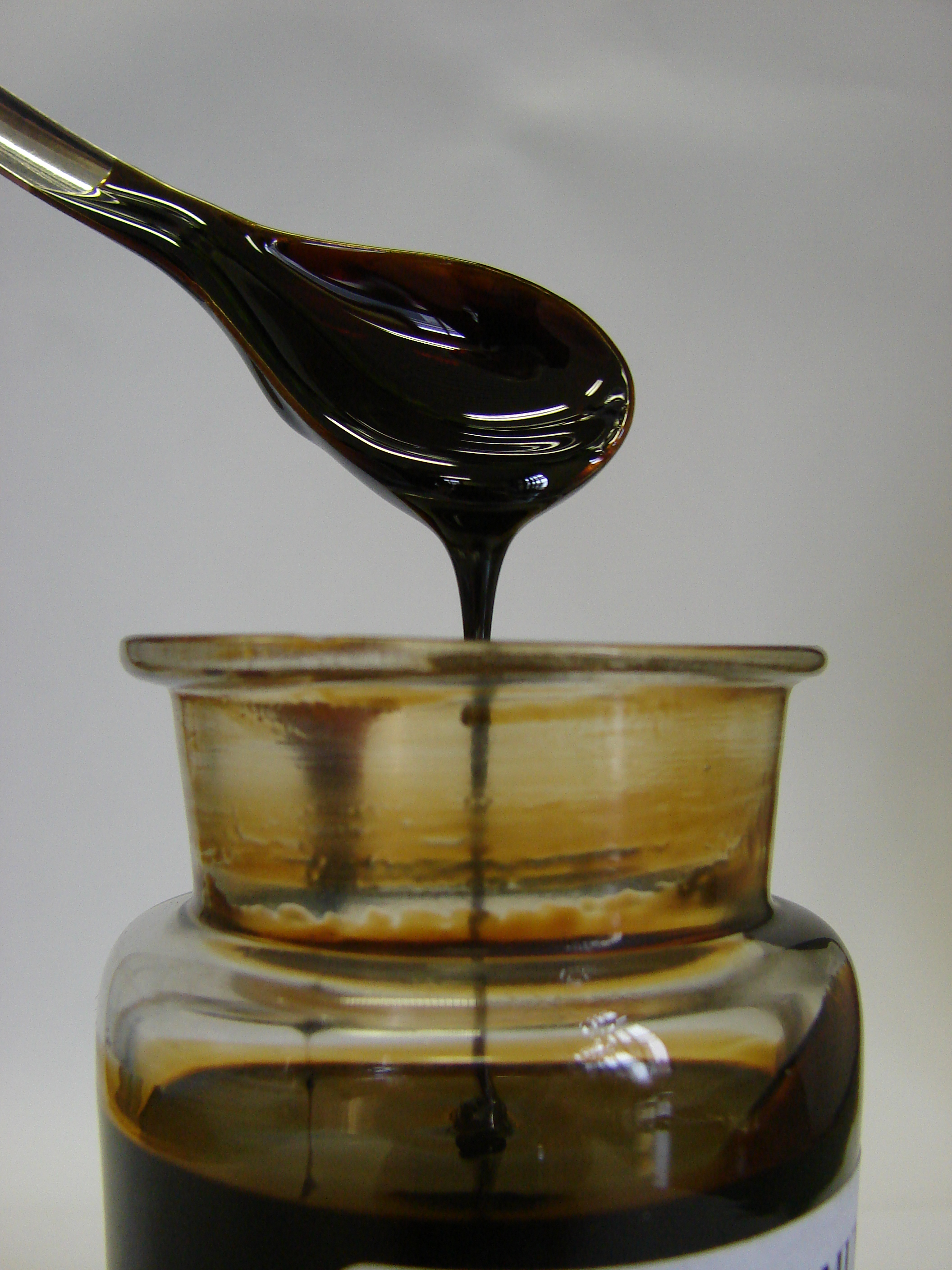
Balsam of Peru

Balsam of Tolu and Balsam of Peru are the products of the species' resin. They are extracted from different varieties in different ways. They are marketed among a series of intermediaries and exporters, their destinations being Germany, the United States of America, England and Spain, where they are used in the manufacture of cosmetics and medicines (for diseases of the skin, bronchi, lungs and airways, and in the treatment of burns and wounds). The tree has been planted for Balsam production in West Africa, India, and Sri Lanka.

The wood is reddish and has interlocked grain, which gives it a strong ribbon-like pattern, and logs produce a large amount of knot-free lumber. The wood has a Janka hardness of 2,200 pounds-force (9,800 N) and is somewhat resistant to fungal decay. Myroxylon balsamum wood is used for flooring, furniture, interior trim, and heavy construction.

M. balsamum is often used as a shade tree in coffee plantations.
