= Diathesis (medicine) =

Predisposition to a group of disorders

In medicine and allied fields, diathesis (IPA: /daɪˈæθəsɪs/) (from Greek διάθεσις) is a hereditary or constitutional predisposition to a group of diseases, an allergy, or other disorder. There are many types of diathesis. Some including strumous diathesis, sthenic diathesis, and many more.

Atopic diathesis is a predisposition to develop one or more of hay fever, allergic rhinitis, bronchial asthma, or atopic dermatitis.

== Types ==
- Lupus diathesis
- Strumous diathesis
- Sthenic diathesis

== See also ==
- Bleeding diathesis
- Diathesis–stress model
