= Balsam of Peru =

Type of tree balsam

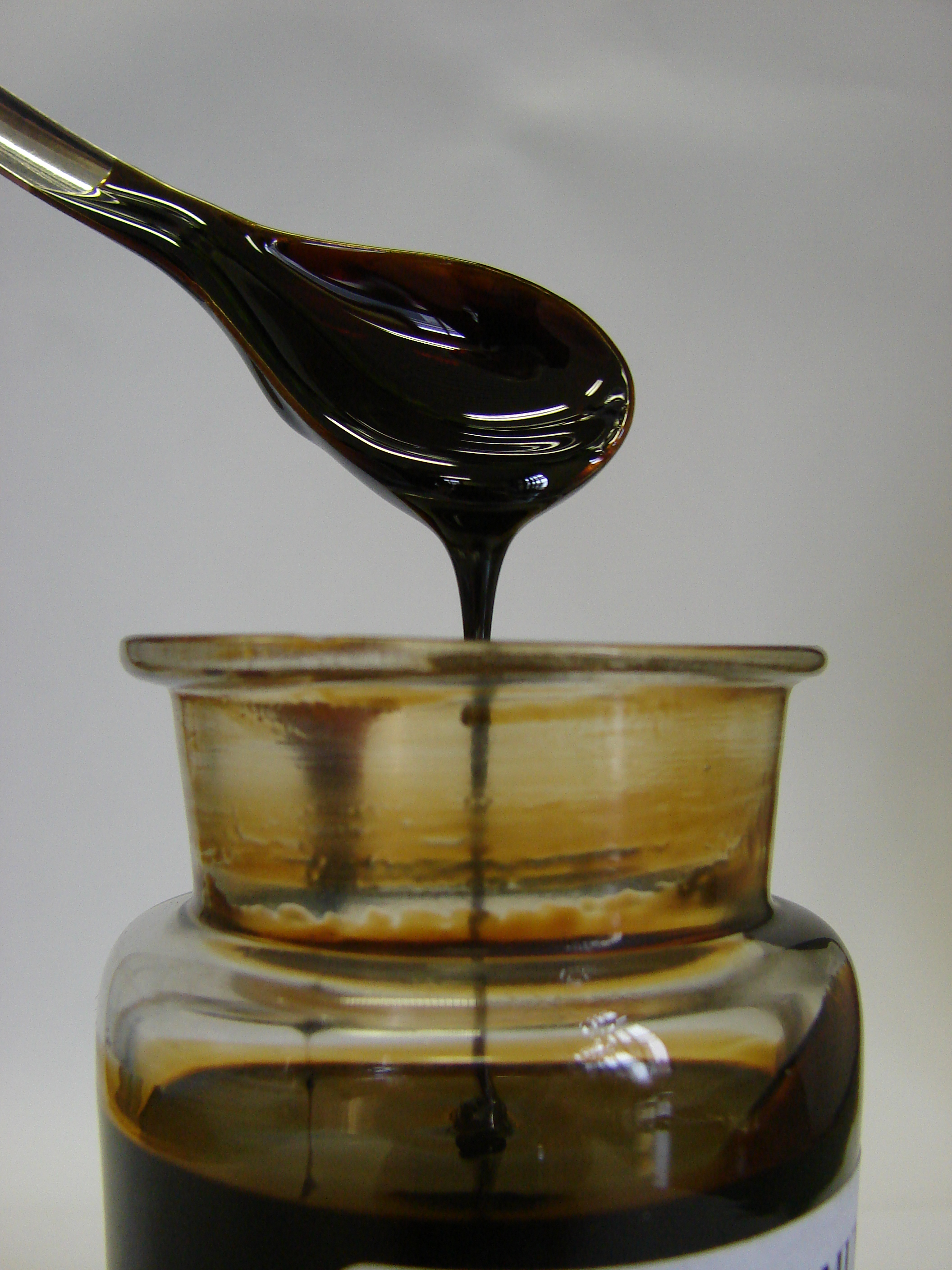
Balsam of Peru

Balsam of Peru or Peru balsam, also known and marketed by many other names, is a balsam derived from a tree known as Myroxylon balsamum var. pereirae; it is found in Central and South America.

Balsam of Peru is used in food and drink for flavoring, in perfumes and toiletries for fragrance, and in medicine and pharmaceutical items for healing properties. It has a sweet scent. In some instances, balsam of Peru is listed on the ingredient label of a product by one of its various names, but it may not be required to be listed by its name by mandatory labeling conventions.

It can cause allergic reactions, with numerous large surveys identifying it as being in the "top five" allergens most commonly causing patch test reactions. It may cause inflammation, redness, swelling, soreness, itching, and blisters, including allergic contact dermatitis, stomatitis (inflammation and soreness of the mouth or tongue), cheilitis (inflammation, rash, or painful erosion of the lips, oropharyngeal mucosa, or angles of the mouth), pruritus, hand eczema, generalized or resistant plantar dermatitis, rhinitis, and conjunctivitis.

== Harvesting and processing ==
Balsam of Peru is obtained by using rags to soak up the resin after strips of bark are removed from the trunk of Myroxylon balsamum var. pereirae, boiling the rags and letting the balsam sink in water. The balsam is an aromatic dark-brown oily fluid.

== Composition ==
Balsam of Peru contains 25 or so different substances, including cinnamein, cinnamic acid, cinnamyl cinnamate, benzyl benzoate, benzoic acid, and vanillin. It also contains cinnamyl alcohol, cinnamaldehyde, farnesol, and nerolidol. A minority of it, approximately 30–40%, contains resins or esters of unknown composition.

== Uses ==
Balsam of Peru is used in food and drink for flavoring, in perfumes and toiletries for fragrance, and in medicine and pharmaceutical items for healing properties. Its aroma is described as sweet, balsamic, vanilla, woody, powdery, and resinous.

In some cases, it is listed on the ingredient label of a product by one of its various names. Naturally occurring ingredients may contain substances identical to or very closely related to balsam of Peru.

It has four primary uses:

- flavoring in foods and drinks such as
  - caffeinated drinks (flavored coffee, flavored tea)
  - alcoholic drinks (wine, beer, gin, liqueurs, apéritifs)
  - soft drinks (cola, root beer)
  - preserved citrus (candied fruit peel, marmalade)
  - tomato-containing products (Mexican and Italian foods with red sauces, ketchup)
  - sauces (chili sauce, barbecue sauce, chutney)
  - pickled vegetables
  - sweets (baked goods and pastries, pudding, ice cream, chewing gum, candy)
- fragrance in perfumes, cosmetics, and toiletries, including colognes, deodorants, soaps, shampoos, conditioners, after-shave lotions, lipsticks, creams, lotions, ointments, baby powders, sunscreens, suntan lotions. Peru balsam listed as one of the main notes in such perfumes as Tom Ford Lost Cherry, Montale Red Vetiver, Chopard Iris Malika, HFC Pink Moon.
- antiseptic and flavoring in medicinal products such as
  - over-the-counter products (toothpaste, mouthwash, hemorrhoid suppositories and ointment, cough medicine/suppressant and lozenges, diaper rash ointments, oral and lip ointments, tincture of benzoin, wound spray [as it has been reported to inhibit Mycobacterium tuberculosis as well as the common ulcer-causing bacteria H. pylori in test-tube studies], calamine lotion, surgical dressings)
  - professional dental supplies (dental cement, eugenol used by dentists, some periodontal impression materials, treatment of dry socket)
- glue, typically as a mounting medium for microscope specimens because purified balsam of Peru's optical properties, specifically its transparency and refractive index of 1.597, are very close to that of many glasses used in optics

It also can be found in scented tobacco, cleaning products, pesticides, insect repellants, air fresheners and deodorizers, scented candles, and oil paint.

== Allergy ==
A number of national and international surveys have identified balsam of Peru as being in the "top five" allergens most commonly causing patch test reactions in people referred to dermatology clinics. A study in 2001 found that 3.8% of the general population patch tested was allergic to it. Many flavorings and perfumes contain components identical to balsam of Peru. It may cause redness, swelling, itching, and blisters.

People allergic to balsam of Peru or other chemically related substances may experience a contact dermatitis reaction. If they have oral exposure, they may experience stomatitis (inflammation and soreness of the mouth or tongue), and cheilitis (inflammation, rash, or painful erosion of the lips, oropharyngeal mucosa, or angles of their mouth). If they ingest it, they may experience pruritus and contact dermatitis in the perianal region, possibly due to unabsorbed substances in the feces. It can cause a flare-up of hand eczema. Among the other allergic reactions to balsam of Peru are generalized or resistant plantar dermatitis, rhinitis, and conjunctivitis, In a case study in Switzerland, a woman who was allergic to balsam of Peru was allergic to her boyfriend's semen following intercourse after he drank large amounts of Coca-Cola.

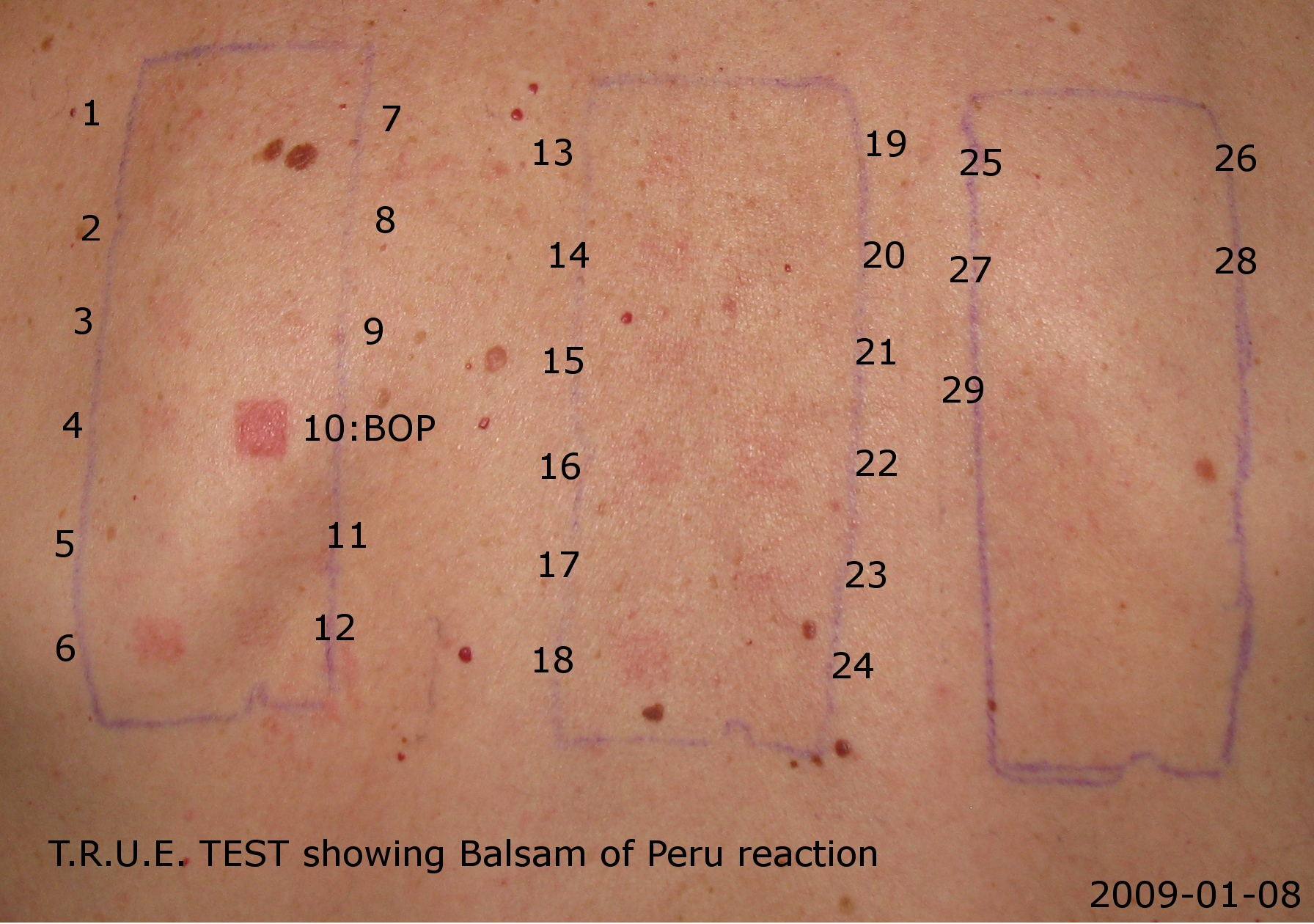
This T.R.U.E. (Thin-Layer Rapid Use Epicutaneous) Patch Test result shows strong reaction to balsam of Peru (#10) and mild reaction to the standard fragrance mix (#6)

A positive patch test is used to diagnose an allergy to balsam of Peru. Positive patch test results indicate that the person may have problems with certain flavorings, medications, and perfumed products. Among foods, the most commonly implicated are spices, citrus, and tomatoes.

People allergic to balsam of Peru may benefit from a diet in which they avoid ingesting foods that contain it. Naturally occurring ingredients may contain substances identical to or very closely related to balsam of Peru, and may cause the same allergic reactions. In some instances, balsam of Peru is listed on the ingredient label of a product by one of its various names, but it may not be required to be listed by its name by mandatory labeling conventions (in fragrances, for example, it may simply be covered by an ingredient listing of "fragrance"). To determine if balsam of Peru is in a product, often doctors have to contact the manufacturer of the products used by the patient.

Before 1977, the main recommended marker for perfume allergy was balsam of Peru, which is still advised. The presence of balsam of Peru in a cosmetic will be denoted by the INCI term Myroxylon pereirae. Because of allergic reactions, since 1982 crude balsam of Peru has been banned by the International Fragrance Association from use as a fragrance compound, but extracts and distillates are used up to a maximum level of 0.4% in products, and are not covered by mandatory labeling.

In March 2006, the European Commission, Health and Consumer Protection Directorate-General, Scientific Committee on Consumer Products, issued an opinion on balsam of Peru. It confirmed that crude balsam of Peru should not be used as a fragrance ingredient, because of a wide variety of test results on its sensitizing potential, but that extracts and distillates can be used up to a maximum level of 0.4% in products.

== History ==
The name balsam of Peru is a misnomer. In the early period of the Spanish conquest of Central and South America, the balsam was collected in Central America and shipped to Callao (the port of Lima) in Peru, then shipped onward to Europe. It acquired the name of "Peru" because it was shipped via there. Its export to Europe was first documented in the seventeenth century in the German pharmacopoeia. Today it is extracted under a handicraft process, and is mainly exported from El Salvador. Another balsam, balsam of Tolu, is extracted from Myroxylon balsamum var. balsamum in a different way.

== Alternate names ==
Among the alternate names used for balsam of Peru are:

- balsam Peru
- Peru balsam
- Peruvian balsam
- bálsamo del Perú (Spanish)
- balsamum Peruvianum (Latin)
- baume du Pérou (French)
- baume Péruvien (French)
- baume de San Salvador (French)
- black balsam
- China oil
- Honduras balsam
- Indian balsam
- Surinam balsam
