= C7H8N2 =

The molecular formula C_{7}H_{8}N_{2} (molar mass: 120.15 g/mol, exact mass: 120.0687 u) may refer to:

- Benzimidazoline
- Benzamidine
