= Embolic and thrombotic events after COVID-19 vaccination =

Post vaccination adverse effects

Post-vaccination embolic and thrombotic events, termed vaccine-induced immune thrombotic thrombocytopenia (VITT), vaccine-induced prothrombotic immune thrombocytopenia (VIPIT), thrombosis with thrombocytopenia syndrome (TTS), vaccine-induced immune thrombocytopenia and thrombosis (VITT), or vaccine-associated thrombotic thrombocytopenia (VATT), are rare types of blood clotting syndromes that were initially observed in a number of people who had previously received the Oxford–AstraZeneca COVID‑19 vaccine (AZD1222) (Note: The Oxford–AstraZeneca COVID‑19 vaccine is codenamed AZD1222, and later supplied under brand names, including Vaxzevria and Covishield.) during the COVID‑19 pandemic. It was subsequently also described in the Janssen COVID‑19 vaccine (Johnson & Johnson), leading to the suspension of its use until its safety had been reassessed.

In April 2021, AstraZeneca and the European Medicines Agency (EMA) updated their information for healthcare professionals about AZD1222, saying it is "considered plausible" that there is a causal relationship between the vaccination and the occurrence of thrombosis in combination with thrombocytopenia and that, "although such adverse reactions are very rare, they exceeded what would be expected in the general population". AstraZeneca initially denied the link, saying "we do not accept that TTS is caused by the vaccine at a generic level". However, later in legal documents filed in February 2024, AstraZeneca admitted its vaccine 'can, in very rare cases, cause TTS'.

On 5 May 2022, the FDA posted a bulletin limiting the use of the Janssen Vaccine to very specific cases due to further reassessment of the risks of TTS, while also FDA also stating in the same bulletin that the benefits of the vaccine outweigh the risks.

Multiple large cohort studies have demonstrated that thrombotic complications after COVID-19 vaccination are very rare, and occur far less frequently than after SARS-CoV-2 infection. A large study using data from more than 29 million people in England found that the risk of cerebral venous sinus thrombosis (CVST) after COVID-19 infection was roughly 8–10 times higher than after the Oxford–AstraZeneca vaccine, and several-fold higher than after mRNA vaccines.

Another population-level analysis published in The BMJ showed that the incidence of thrombocytopenia and thromboembolic events after vaccination was orders of magnitude lower than after COVID-19 infection, concluding that "the risks of these adverse events are substantially higher following SARS-CoV-2 infection than after vaccination". A third population-level analysis concluded similar, with its cohort studies revealing a "higher risk of arterial and venous thromboses after COVID-19 infection compared to vaccination". Overall, the scientific consensus is that while rare vaccine-associated clotting syndromes can occur, COVID-19 infection poses a far greater thrombotic risk.

== Signs and symptoms ==
The thrombosis events associated with the COVID‑19 vaccine may occur 4–28 days after its administration and mainly affects women under 55. Several relatively unusual types of thrombosis were specifically reported to be occurring in those with the reaction: cerebral venous sinus thrombosis and thrombosis of the splanchnic veins. Cerebral venous sinus thrombosis may cause severe headache, stroke-like symptoms (weakness of a limb and/or facial muscles), seizures and coma. Splanchnic vein thrombosis may cause abdominal pain, accumulation of fluid in the abdominal cavity, and gastrointestinal bleeding.

Other forms of thrombosis, such as the more common pulmonary embolism, may also occur. Arterial thrombosis has also been reported. The low platelet count may manifest as petechia (tiny blood spots under the skin) beyond the site of the injection.

Disseminated intravascular coagulation (DIC), diffuse formation of blood clots throughout the blood vessels of the body, has been reported as part of the syndrome. DIC may cause a range of symptoms, including abnormal bleeding, breathlessness, chest pain, neurological symptoms, low blood pressure, or swelling.

COVID‑19 vaccines have some adverse effects that are listed as common in the two or three days following vaccination which are usually mild and temporary.

== Causes ==
The rare simultaneous occurrence of thrombocytopenia (low blood platelets) with blood clots after vaccination raised the original concern about this condition. In many cases where acute thrombosis and thrombocytopenia have been found together after COVID‑19 vaccination, an antibody against platelet factor 4 (PF4) has been identified. This phenomenon is mostly encountered in some people who have been administered heparin, but none of the reported cases had received heparin. More rarely, this phenomenon had previously been described as an autoimmune phenomenon in people who had not been exposed to heparin. One striking feature of thrombocytopenia in the presence of anti-PF4 antibodies is the propensity of some to develop thrombosis, a phenomenon called heparin-induced thrombocytopenia if heparin is involved.

Thrombocytopenia is generally a common symptom after or during many viral infections, and it "has been consistently reported" after intravenous administration of adenoviral gene transfer vectors, although its mechanisms are not yet clear.

There is no confirmed causal link to the syndrome and any COVID‑19 vaccination, however EMA is conducting investigations into AZD1222 and the Janssen COVID‑19 vaccine (Johnson & Johnson) for possible causal links.

On 7 April 2021, the EMA noted one "plausible explanation" for the combination of blood clots and low blood platelets is "an immune response, leading to a condition similar to one seen sometimes in people treated with heparin", that is heparin induced thrombocytopenia (HIT).

== Diagnosis ==
In the United Kingdom, professional societies led by the Royal College of Emergency Medicine have issued a guideline for suspected cases. Someone presenting with concerning symptoms between five and 28 days after administration of the vaccine is assessed for a possible thrombotic complication, with a full blood count (which includes a platelet count) as the initial investigation. If the platelet count is decreased, determination of the D-dimer and fibrinogen levels may be performed, with hematology expert advice recommended if these are elevated above specific cut offs.

== Management ==
Guidelines from professional societies recommend treatment with alternative anticoagulants instead of heparin, as there is a possibility that it may aggravate the phenomenon. Alternative options as the directly acting oral anticoagulants (DOACs), argatroban, fondaparinux or danaparoid depending on the circumstances. Platelet transfusion is discouraged, as this too may aggravate thrombosis. UK guidelines by the British Society for Haematology recommend the administration of intravenous immunoglobulin (IVIG) to reduce levels of the pathogenic antibody. Low fibrinogen levels may require correction with fibrinogen concentrate or cryoprecipitate.

== Epidemiology ==
The Paul Ehrlich Institute has recorded 31 cerebral venous sinus thromboses (CVST) and nine deaths out of 2.7 million vaccinated in Germany with the AZD1222. On 2 April 2021, the UK's Medicines and Healthcare products Regulatory Agency reported 22 cases of CVST and a further eight cases of clotting problems both associated with a low level of blood platelets following a "rigorous review" of its Yellow Card reporting. The institute also reported finding no events of this type which occurred after vaccination with the Pfizer–BioNTech COVID‑19 vaccine. The EMA had earlier said that a link between certain very rare blood clots and the AstraZeneca vaccine is "not proven, but is possible".

Observations in Germany of these rare events seemed to relate mostly women aged under 55. However, because Germany had previously restricted AZD1222 to under 65s, the population vaccinated there with AZD1222 is comparatively younger, and consequently contained a higher proportion of women taking the contraceptive pill. As CVSTs are more likely in women using hormonal contraceptives, this inherent risk factor may be an influence on the reported preponderance of women experiencing these events following vaccination. The UK, in contrast, has applied its Pfizer and AZD1222 vaccines generally to older groups first, then by decreasing age.

The UK Medicines and Healthcare products Regulatory Agency (MHRA) reporting regards AZD1222 to 3 November 2021, recording 73 deaths out of 425 cases (17%) in the context of 24.9 million first doses administered. A February 2022 study which examined a potential causal link between COVID-19 vaccines and excess deaths found that out of more than 250 million americans vaccinated only 55 cases of death after COVID-19 vaccination were reported and in 17 of these a causal relationship had been excluded.

=== Regulatory status ===
According to the European Medicines Agency (EMA), as of 28 March 2021, the reported number of cases of embolic and thrombotic events after vaccination is lower than the rate of such events in the general population overall. However, the specific syndrome - of embolic and thrombotic events in combination with low levels of blood platelets - presenting in post-vaccination cases raised the possibility of an association between the vaccine and the relatively rare syndrome. The EMA also said that there is no proof that these events are caused by the vaccines, but that the possibility could not yet be ruled out completely. Accordingly, the EMA advised that people who received the vaccine and experienced symptoms suggestive of thrombosis, including shortness of breath, blurred vision and severe or persistent headache, should seek medical attention.

In a press briefing on 7 April 2021, Emer Cooke, the executive director of the European Medicines Agency (EMA) began by stating "Our safety committee, the Pharmacovigilance Risk Assessment Committee (PRAC) of the European Medicines Agency, has confirmed that the benefits of the AstraZeneca vaccine in preventing COVID‑19 overall outweigh the risks of side effects. COVID‑19 is a very serious disease with high hospitalization and death rates and every day COVID is still causing thousands of deaths across the EU. This vaccine has proven to be highly effective, it prevents severe disease and hospitalization, and it is saving lives. Vaccination is extremely important in helping us in the fight against COVID‑19 and we need to use the vaccines we have to protect us from the devastating effects". She went on to say "The PRAC after a very in-depth analysis has concluded that the reported cases of unusual blood clotting following vaccination with the AstraZeneca vaccine should be listed as possible side effects of the vaccine". At the same briefing Dr. Samina Strauss of PRAC confirmed "our conclusion is that these clotting disorders are very rare side effects of the vaccine".

The UK Medicines and Healthcare products Regulatory Agency (MHRA) held a news conference on 7 April 2021, and while there is no proof that the AZD1222 vaccination caused the rare blood clots, they indicated the possibility of a link is getting stronger. The UK is to offer under 30s alternative vaccines. The reasoning is because in the 20-29 age range the benefits to individual of vaccination were less as their likelihood of harm from COVID‑19 is less and closer to the potential risk of harm from the vaccine (at a medium exposure risk with COVID‑19 infection cases running at a rate of 60 per 100,000). For higher age groups the benefit to risk ratio increased.

Also on 7 April 2021, an interim statement from the WHO said its advisory body, GACVS, found any "causal relationship" between the rare blood clot cases and AZD1222 to be "plausible but is not confirmed".

On 20 April 2021, the safety committee of the EMA (PRAC) found a "possible link to very rare cases of unusual blood clots with low blood platelets" for the Johnson & Johnson Janssen vaccine; and required that these rare events, similar to those noted for AZD1222, should be listed as a very rare side effect. The EMA states the overall risk-benefit for the Janssen vaccine remains positive.

On 16 December 2021, the US Centers for Disease Control and Prevention (CDC) recommended the Moderna and Pfizer-BioNTech vaccines should be preferred over the Janssen vaccine, following growing concerns about rare blood clots. Janssen should still be offered to people who specifically request it.

== History ==
=== Organizations ===
Global vaccine safety comes under the remit of the World Health Organization (WHO), and in particular its Global Advisory Committee on Vaccine Safety (GAVCS). Other drug regulatory agencies significantly involved include:

- European Medicines Agency (EMA), the regional regulatory authority for the EU.
- Medicines and Healthcare products Regulatory Agency (MHRA), the medical authority for the United Kingdom.
- Paul Ehrlich Institute (PEI), a German federal agency supervised by the Federal Ministry of Health with expertise in vaccines and biomedicines. It is a WHO collaborating centre.

=== Syndrome identification ===
A number of COVID‑19 vaccines began to become approved and available at scale in December 2020, with vaccinations beginning to ramp up at scale from the beginning of 2021, among them the Oxford–AstraZeneca COVID‑19 vaccine, based on an adenovirus vector and internally termed AZD1222.

On 11 March 2021, the EMA issued a statement noting Denmark had suspended AZD1222 vaccinations due to a vaccinated patient dying with blood clots. While noting there had been reports of other vaccinated people having blood clots and that its safety committee is already reviewing such cases, the number of thromboembolic events in vaccinated people is no higher than in the general population.

The World Health Organization (WHO) Global Advisory Committee on Vaccine Safety on 19 March 2021, issued a statement relating to safety signals related to AZD1222 relating to events of thromboembolism and thrombocytopenia following review of available data and conclusions included that AZD1222 "a positive benefit-risk profile, with tremendous potential to prevent infections and reduce deaths across the world".

In its safety update of 29 March 2021, the EMA indicated it had initiated investigations into the very rare cases of specific embolic and thrombotic events in combination with thrombocytopenia (low levels of blood platelets) and related bleeding including disseminated intravascular coagulation and cerebral venous sinus thrombosis (CVST), noting any link with AZD1222 is not proven but could not be excluded. The EMA also initiated an assessment for all COVID‑19 vaccines used in the EU for immune thrombocytopenia (ITP), described as low blood platelet levels that could lead to bruising and bleeding, as a possible side effect, whilst also stating that up to this point no link with any COVID‑19 had been established.

On 7 April 2021, the EMA determined that unusual blood clots with low blood platelets should be listed as very rare side effects of AZD1222, with WHO and UK EHRA issuing generally similar statements on the same day. None of the agencies found a confirmed causal link between the vaccine and these incidents at the time, but were listing them out of an abundance of caution.

A highlight of minutes of the EMA's Pharmacovigilance Risk Assessment Committee (PRAC) concluding 9 April 2021, indicating they also were investigating four cases of unusual blood clots with low blood platelets, including one death, amongst people who had taken the Janssen COVID‑19 vaccine. The Janssen vaccine is approved but not yet deployed in the EU, though vaccinations are in progress in the US. PRAC has determined that it is not clear if there is a causal association. Should regulatory action prove necessary, PRAC have indicated the likely outcome would be an update to product information characteristics.

=== Vaccination campaign responses ===
Early reports of the events of concern seemed to indicate the presentation rate for the specific blood clots of concern might be higher for women of younger ages, UK Medicines and Healthcare products Regulatory Agency (MHRA) found examples across all genders and ages, their data skewing towards these specific blood clots being more prevalent in AZD1222 vaccinated persons of younger ages.

The WHO has continued to stress the administration of vaccines is based on risk versus benefit analysis. Some variables that may be factored into such analysis include risk of an individual from catching COVID‑19, which relate to the infection rate in that area, and the benefits to that individual if vaccinated and exposed to COVID‑19 which varies with age, versus whatever the risks of vaccination are to that individual.

==== Regional and national responses ====
The advisory panel for the government of Ontario, Canada has recommended against the use of heparin for management of thrombosis after vaccination until more is known.

In response to the concerns over the adverse effects relating to rare blood clotting types Germany has suspended use of the AZD1222 in those under 60 years of age; in contrast to a period previously having suspended use of AZD1222 to over–65s due to limited data of the efficacy of the vaccine to this age group at that time.

Following a few days of suspended use of AZD1222, the Ministry of Health, Welfare and Sport of the Netherlands decided to continue administering the vaccine only to persons above the age of 60.

On 8 April 2021, the Australian Technical Advisory Group on Immunisation (ATAGI) advised the Australian Government that the Pfizer COVID‑19 vaccine is recommended over AZD1222 for adults aged under 50 years. The advice is "based on the increasing risk of severe outcomes from COVID‑19 in older adults (and hence a higher benefit from vaccination) and a potentially increased risk of thrombosis with thrombocytopenia following AstraZeneca vaccination in those under 50 years." AZD1222 is still recommended by ATAGI for people over 50, and those under 50 who have already had their first dose with no ill effects. In the state of Victoria, there were reports of some, aged under 50, being turned away from vaccination centres, despite having confirmed appointments. It is understood a special consent process will be developed by the Australian Government for people under 50 who choose to receive the AZD1222 vaccine.

== Studies ==
A study convened by a group of British hematologists on 19 March 2021, just two days after the acknowledgement of the condition, published its finding in The New England Journal of Medicine, establishing case definition criteria. The study included 294 participants who presented with symptoms of thrombocytopenia and thrombosis after receipt of the first dose of the Oxford–AstraZeneca COVID‑19 vaccine, showing an independent association between baseline platelet count and the presence of intracranial haemorrhage. The study established that 85% of the participants affected by the condition were younger than 60 years, and that those participants with a history of thrombosis or prothrombotic disorders did not appear to be at increased risk. The study showed an overall mortality rate of 22% and set out plans for additional research to determine the genetic factors that may increase risk of the condition and identify potential therapeutic agents.

Multiple large cohort studies have demonstrated that thrombotic complications after COVID-19 vaccination are very rare, and occur far less frequently than after SARS-CoV-2 infection. A large study using data from more than 29 million people in England found that the risk of cerebral venous sinus thrombosis (CVST) after COVID-19 infection was roughly 8–10 times higher than after the Oxford–AstraZeneca vaccine, and several-fold higher than after mRNA vaccines. Another population-level analysis published in The BMJ showed that the incidence of thrombocytopenia and thromboembolic events after vaccination was orders of magnitude lower than after COVID-19 infection, concluding that "the risks of these adverse events are substantially higher following SARS-CoV-2 infection than after vaccination." Overall, the scientific consensus is that while rare vaccine-associated clotting syndromes can occur, COVID-19 infection poses a far greater thrombotic risk.
