= Direct thrombin inhibitor =

Anticoagulant medication taken by mouth

Direct thrombin inhibitors (DTIs) are a class of medication that act as anticoagulants (delaying blood clotting) by directly inhibiting the enzyme thrombin (factor IIa). Some are in clinical use, while others are undergoing clinical development. Several members of the class are expected to replace heparin (and derivatives) and warfarin in various clinical scenarios.

== Types ==
There are three types of DTIs, dependent on their interaction with the thrombin molecule. Bivalent DTIs (hirudin and analogs) bind both to the active site and exosite 1, while univalent DTIs bind only to the active site. The third class of inhibitors, which are gaining importance recently, is the allosteric inhibitors.

=== Bivalent ===
Hirudin and derivatives were originally discovered in Hirudo medicinalis:

- Hirudin
- Bivalirudin (transient inhibition - is cleaved by thrombin)
- Lepirudin
- Desirudin

=== Univalent ===
Univalent DTIs include:

- Argatroban
- Inogatran
- Melagatran (and its prodrug ximelagatran)
- Dabigatran

=== Allosteric inhibitors ===
Thrombin demonstrates a high level of allosteric regulation. Allosterism in thrombin is regulated by the exosites 1 and 2 and the sodium binding site. A recent patent review has shown that the general consensus among researchers is that allosteric inhibitors may provide a more regulatable anticoagulant. Some of the allosteric inhibitors discovered include DNA aptamers, benzofuran dimers, benzofuran trimers, as well as polymeric lignins. A new sulfated β-O4 lignin (SbO4L) has been discovered which has shown a dual mechanism of action for anti-thrombosis. This SbO4L shows allosteric inhibition of thrombin for fibrinogen, while providing a competitive inhibition of thrombin interaction with platelet glycoprotein Ibα (GPIbα), thereby preventing thrombin mediated platelet aggregation. However, despite the growing interest and the advances in allosterism, no allosteric thrombin inhibitor has yet reached the stage of clinical trials.

== Uses ==
Bivalent DTIs enjoy limited use in circumstances where heparin would be indicated such as the acute coronary syndrome ("unstable angina"), but cannot be used. As they are administered by injection (intravenous, intramuscular or subcutaneous), they are less suitable for long-term treatment.

Argatroban (as well as the hirudins) is used for heparin-induced thrombocytopenia (HIT), a relatively infrequent yet serious complication of heparin treatment that requires anticoagulation (as it increases both arterial and venous thrombosis risk) but not with the causative agent, heparin.

Ximelagatran showed good efficacy compared with warfarin in several trials in prevention and treatment of deep vein thrombosis and as thromboprophylaxis in atrial fibrillation. Development was stopped by manufacturer AstraZeneca, however, because of reports of liver enzyme derangements and liver failure.

Dabigatran is an oral direct thrombin inhibitor. Dabigatran (Pradaxa) was found to be noninferior to Warfarin in prevention of ischemic stroke, as well as intracranial hemorrhage risk and overall mortality for non-valvular atrial fibrillation according to the RE-LY trial.

== Monitoring ==
There is no therapeutic drug monitoring widely available for DTIs, in contrast with warfarin (INR) and heparin (APTT). The ecarin clotting time, although not in general clinical use, would be the most appropriate monitoring test.

== See also ==
- Discovery and development of direct thrombin inhibitors
