= Inogatran =

Names
- IUPAC name 2-{[(2R)-1-[(2S)-2-[(4-Carbamimidamidopropyl)carbamoyl]piperidin-1-yl]-3-cyclohexyl-1-oxopropan-2-yl]amino}acetic acid
- Other names N-[(1R)-2-Cyclohexyl-1-[[(2S)-2-[(3-guanidinopropyl)carbamoyl]piperidino]carbonyl] ethyl]glycine

Identifiers
CAS Number	155415-08-0
3D model (JSmol)	Interactive image
ChEMBL	ChEMBL114715
ChemSpider	59397
PubChem CID	66005
UNII	428409I84L
CompTox Dashboard (EPA)	DTXSID50165895
- InChI: InChI=1S/C21H38N6O4/c22-21(23)25-11-6-10-24-19(30)17-9-4-5-12-27(17)20(31)16(26-14-18(28)29)13-15-7-2-1-3-8-15/h15-17,26H,1-14H2,(H,24,30)(H,28,29)(H4,22,23,25)/t16-,17+/m1/s1 Key: CDPROXZBMHOBTQ-SJORKVTESA-N
- SMILES: NC(=N)NCCCNC(=O)[C@@H]1CCCCN1C(=O)[C@@H](CC2CCCCC2)NCC(=O)O

Properties
Chemical formula	C_{21}H_{38}N_{6}O_{4}
Molar mass	438.6 g/mol
- Except where otherwise noted, data are given for materials in their standard state (at 25 °C [77 °F], 100 kPa). Infobox references

Inogatran (INN) is a low molecular weight peptidomimetic thrombin inhibitor. Inogatran was developed for the potential treatment of arterial and venous thrombotic diseases.
