= Hirudin =

Chemical compound in leeches

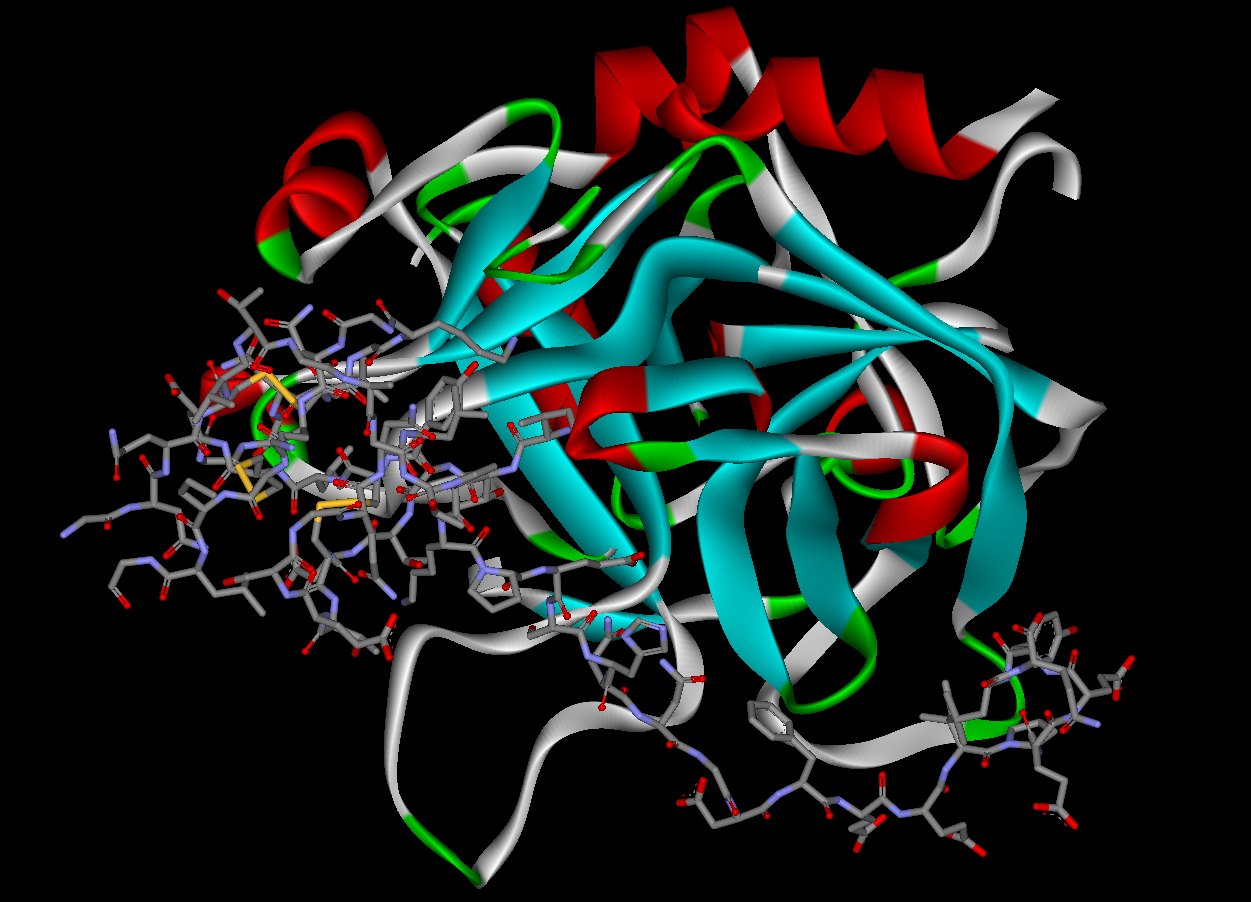
- Structure of hirudin (ball-stick model) in complex with thrombin (ribbon model).

Identifiers
- Symbol: Hirudin
- Pfam: PF00713
- InterPro: IPR000429
- SCOP2: 4htc / SCOPe / SUPFAM
Available protein structures:
- PDB: IPR000429 PF00713 (ECOD; PDBsum)
- AlphaFold: IPR000429; PF00713

Hirudin is a naturally occurring peptide in the salivary glands of blood-sucking leeches (such as Hirudo medicinalis) that has a blood anticoagulant property. This is essential for the leeches' habit of feeding on blood, since it keeps a host's blood flowing after the worm's initial puncture of the skin.

== Structure ==
During his years in Birmingham and Edinburgh, John Berry Haycraft had been actively engaged in research and published papers on the coagulation of blood, and in 1884, he discovered that the leech secreted a powerful anticoagulant, which he named hirudin, although it was not isolated until the 1950s, nor its structure fully determined until 1976. Full length hirudin is made up of 65 amino acids. These amino acids are organized into a compact N-terminal domain containing three disulfide bonds and a C-terminal domain that is completely disordered when the protein is un-complexed in solution. Amino acid residues 1-3 form a parallel beta-strand with residues 214-217 of thrombin, the nitrogen atom of residue 1 making a hydrogen bond with the Ser-195 O gamma atom of the catalytic site. The C-terminal domain makes numerous electrostatic interactions with an anion-binding exosite of thrombin, while the last five residues are in a helical loop that forms many hydrophobic contacts. Natural hirudin contains a mixture of various isoforms of the protein. However, recombinant techniques can be used to produce homogeneous preparations of hirudin.

== Biological activity ==
A key event in the final stages of blood coagulation is the conversion of fibrinogen into fibrin by the serine protease enzyme thrombin. Thrombin is produced from prothrombin, by the action of an enzyme, prothrombinase (Factor Xa along with Factor Va as a cofactor), in the final states of coagulation. Fibrin is then cross linked by factor XIII (Fibrin Stabilizing Factor) to form a blood clot. The principal inhibitor of thrombin in normal blood circulation is antithrombin. Similar to antithrombin, the anticoagulant activity of hirudin is based on its ability to inhibit the procoagulant activity of thrombin.

Hirudin is the most potent natural inhibitor of thrombin. Unlike antithrombin, hirudin binds to and inhibits only the activated thrombin, with a specific activity on fibrinogen. Therefore, hirudin prevents or dissolves the formation of clots and thrombi (i.e., it has a thrombolytic activity), and has therapeutic value in blood coagulation disorders, in the treatment of skin hematomas and of superficial varicose veins, either as an injectable or a topical application cream. In some aspects, hirudin has advantages over more commonly used anticoagulants and thrombolytics, such as heparin, as it does not interfere with the biological activity of other serum proteins, and can also act on complexed thrombin.

== Medical use ==
Hirudin variant-1

Identifiers
- Organism: Hirudo medicinalis
- Symbol: ?
- UniProt: P01050
Search for
- Structures: Swiss-model
- Domains: InterPro

It is difficult to extract large amounts of hirudin from natural sources, so a method for producing and purifying this protein (specifically P01050 in the infobox) using recombinant biotechnology has been developed. This has led to the development and marketing of a number of hirudin-based anticoagulant pharmaceutical products, including:

- recombinant hirudin derived from Hansenula (Thrombexx, Extrauma)
- lepirudin (Refludan) – differs by one amino acid substitution and removal of sulfate group on Tyr63
- desirudin (Revasc/Iprivask) – differs by removal of sulfate group on Tyr63
- bivalirudin – peptide fragment

Several other direct thrombin inhibitors are derived chemically from hirudin.

== See also ==
- Hirudotherapy
- Discovery and development of direct thrombin inhibitors
