= Ximelagatran =

Anticoagulant

Clinical data
- Trade names: Exanta
- Pregnancy category: Uncategorized
- Routes of administration: Oral (tablets)
- ATC code: B01AE05 (WHO)

Legal status
- Legal status: Withdrawn from market

Pharmacokinetic data
- Bioavailability: 20%
- Metabolism: to melagatran
- Elimination half-life: 3–5 hours
- Excretion: Renal (80%)

Identifiers
- IUPAC name: ethyl 2-[[(1R)-1-cyclohexyl-2- [(2S)-2-[[4-(N'-hydroxycarbamimidoyl) phenyl]methylcarbamoyl]azetidin-1-yl]- 2-oxo-ethyl]amino]acetate
- CAS Number: 192939-46-1
- PubChem CID: 9574101
- IUPHAR/BPS: 6381
- DrugBank: DB04898
- ChemSpider: 7848559
- UNII: 49HFB70472
- KEGG: D01981
- ChEMBL: ChEMBL522038
- CompTox Dashboard (EPA): DTXSID5049075

Chemical and physical data
- Formula: C_{24}H_{35}N_{5}O_{5}
- Molar mass: 473.574 g·mol^{−1} (429 g/mol after conversion)
- 3D model (JSmol): Interactive image
- SMILES: O=C(NCc1ccc(C(=N\O)\N)cc1)[C@H]3N(C(=O)[C@H](NCC(=O)OCC)C2CCCCC2)CC3
- InChI: InChI=1S/C24H35N5O5/c1-2-34-20(30)15-26-21(17-6-4-3-5-7-17)24(32)29-13-12-19(29)23(31)27-14-16-8-10-18(11-9-16)22(25)28-33/h8-11,17,19,21,26,33H,2-7,12-15H2,1H3,(H2,25,28)(H,27,31)/t19-,21+/m0/s1; Key:ZXIBCJHYVWYIKI-PZJWPPBQSA-N

Ximelagatran (Exanta or Exarta, H 376/95) is an anticoagulant that has been investigated extensively as a replacement for warfarin that would overcome the problematic dietary, drug interaction, and monitoring issues associated with warfarin therapy. In 2006, its manufacturer AstraZeneca announced that it would withdraw pending applications for marketing approval after reports of hepatotoxicity (liver damage) during trials, and discontinue its distribution in countries where the drug had been approved (Germany, Portugal, Sweden, Finland, Norway, Iceland, Austria, Denmark, France, Switzerland, Argentina and Brazil).

== Method of action ==
Ximelagatran, a direct thrombin inhibitor, was the first member of this class that can be taken orally. It acts solely by inhibiting the actions of thrombin. It is taken orally twice daily, and rapidly absorbed by the small intestine. Ximelagatran is a prodrug, being converted in vivo to the active agent melagatran. This conversion takes place in the liver and many other tissues through hydrolysis and dehydroxylation (replacing the ethyl and hydroxyl groups with hydrogen).

The conversion of ximelagatran to melagatran. This conversion includes dealkylation and dehydroxylation.

== Uses ==
Ximelagatran was expected to replace warfarin and sometimes aspirin and heparin in many therapeutic settings, including deep venous thrombosis, prevention of secondary venous thromboembolism and complications of atrial fibrillation such as stroke. The efficacy of ximelagatran for these indications had been well documented, except for non valvular atrial fibrillation.

An advantage, according to early reports by its manufacturer, was that it could be taken orally without any monitoring of its anticoagulant properties. This would have set it apart from warfarin and heparin, which require monitoring of the international normalized ratio (INR) and the partial thromboplastin time (PTT), respectively. A disadvantage recognised early was the absence of an antidote in case acute bleeding develops, while warfarin can be antagonised by prothrombin complex concentrate and/or vitamin K and heparin by protamine sulfate.

== Side effects ==
Ximelagatran was generally well tolerated in the trial populations, but a small proportion (5–6%) developed elevated liver enzyme levels, which prompted the FDA to reject an initial application for approval in 2004. The further development was discontinued in 2006 following reports of hepatotoxicity. Subsequent analysis of Phase 2 clinical study data using extreme value modelling showed that the elevated liver enzyme levels observed in Phase 3 clinical studies could have been predicted; if this had been known at the time, it might have affected decisions on future development of the compound.

A chemically different but pharmacologically similar substance, AZD-0837, was developed by AstraZeneca for similar indications. It is a prodrug of a potent, competitive, reversible inhibitor of free and fibrin-bound thrombin called ARH0637. The development of AZD-0837 has been discontinued. Due to a limitation identified in long-term stability of the extended-release AZD-0837 drug product, a follow-up study from ASSURE on stroke prevention in patients with non-valvular atrial fibrillation, was prematurely closed in 2010 after 2 years. There was also a numerically higher mortality against warfarin. In a Phase 2 trial for AF the mean serum creatinine concentration increased by about 10% from baseline in patients treated with AZD-0837, which returned to baseline after cessation of therapy.
