= Benzimidazoline =

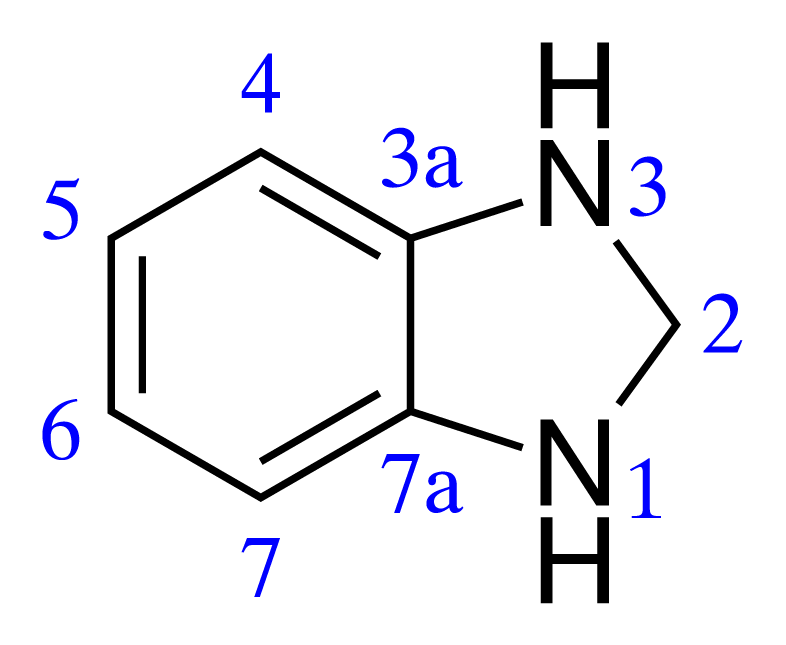

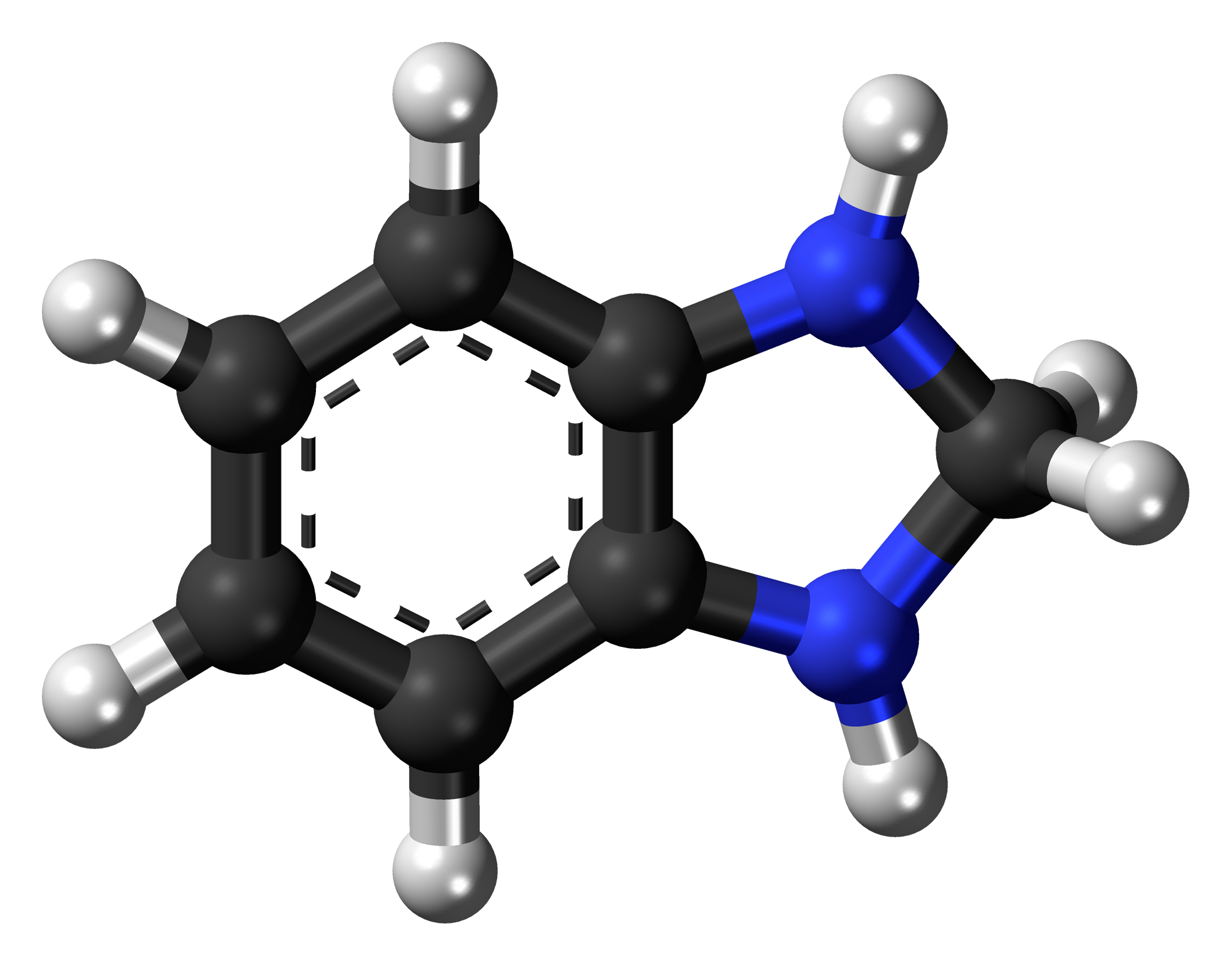

Names
- Preferred IUPAC name 2,3-Dihydro-1H-benzimidazole

Identifiers
CAS Number	4746-67-2
3D model (JSmol)	Interactive image
ChemSpider	10607516
PubChem CID	15745046
UNII	9LPD663GTK
CompTox Dashboard (EPA)	DTXSID501309406
- InChI: InChI=1S/C7H8N2/c1-2-4-7-6(3-1)8-5-9-7/h1-4,8-9H,5H2 Key: MXMZCLLIUQEKSN-UHFFFAOYSA-N; InChI=1/C7H8N2/c1-2-4-7-6(3-1)8-5-9-7/h1-4,8-9H,5H2 Key: MXMZCLLIUQEKSN-UHFFFAOYAO
- SMILES: C12=CC=CC=C1NCN2

Properties
Chemical formula	C_{7}H_{8}N_{2}
Molar mass	120.155 g·mol^{−1}
- Except where otherwise noted, data are given for materials in their standard state (at 25 °C [77 °F], 100 kPa). verify (what is ?) Infobox references

Benzimidazolines are a family of heterocyclic compounds, based on a benzene ring fused with an imidazoline. The parent compound has the chemical formula C_{7}H_{8}N_{2}.
