= Bivalirudin =

Anticoagulant drug

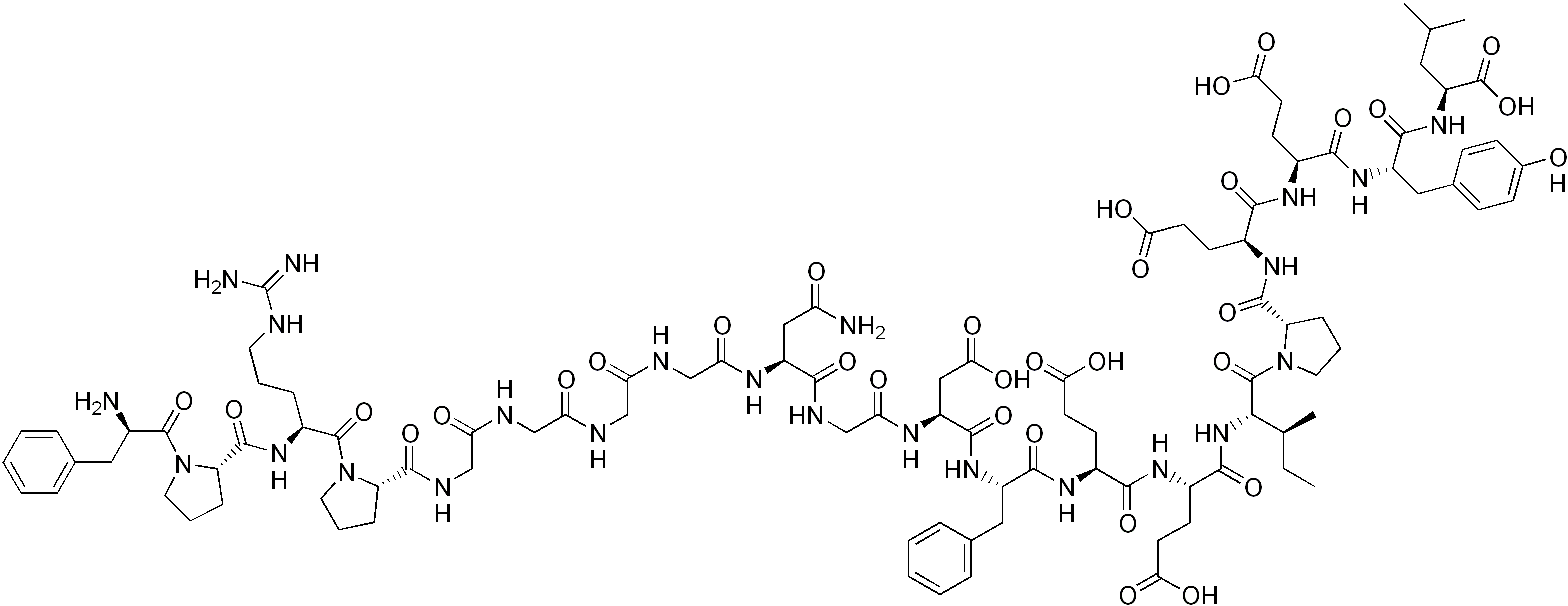

Clinical data
- Trade names: Angiomax, Angiox, others
- AHFS/Drugs.com: Monograph
- License data: EU EMA: by INN
- Routes of administration: Intravenous injection/infusion only
- ATC code: B01AE06 (WHO)

Legal status
- Legal status: CA: ℞-only; US: ℞-only; EU: Withdrawn; In general: ℞ (Prescription only)

Pharmacokinetic data
- Bioavailability: N/A (IV application only)
- Metabolism: Angiomax is cleared from plasma by a combination of renal mechanisms and proteolytic cleavage
- Elimination half-life: ~25 minutes in patients with normal renal function

Identifiers
- IUPAC name: D-phenylalanyl-L-prolyl-L-arginyl-L-prolylglycylglycylglycylglycyl-L-asparaginylglycyl-L-α-aspartyl-L-phenylalanyl-L-α-glutamyl-L-α-glutamyl-L-isoleucyl-L-prolyl-L-α-glutamyl-L-α-glutamyl-L-tyrosyl-L-leucine
- CAS Number: 128270-60-0
- PubChem CID: 16129704
- IUPHAR/BPS: 6470
- DrugBank: DB00006
- ChemSpider: 10482069
- UNII: TN9BEX005G
- ChEBI: CHEBI:59173
- ChEMBL: ChEMBL1201455
- CompTox Dashboard (EPA): DTXSID00155847

Chemical and physical data
- Formula: C_{98}H_{138}N_{24}O_{33}
- Molar mass: 2180.317 g·mol^{−1}
- SMILES: CC[C@H](C)[C@@H](C(=O)N1CCC[C@H]1C(=O)N[C@@H](CCC(=O)O)C(=O)N[C@@H](CCC(=O)O)C(=O)N[C@@H](CC2=CC=C(C=C2)O)C(=O)N[C@@H](CC(C)C)C(=O)O)NC(=O)[C@H](CCC(=O)O)NC(=O)[C@H](CCC(=O)O)NC(=O)[C@H](CC3=CC=CC=C3)NC(=O)[C@H](CC(=O)O)NC(=O)CNC(=O)[C@H](CC(=O)N)NC(=O)CNC(=O)CNC(=O)CNC(=O)CNC(=O)[C@@H]4CCCN4C(=O)[C@H](CCCNC(=N)N)NC(=O)[C@@H]5CCCN5C(=O)[C@@H](CC6=CC=CC=C6)N
- InChI: InChI=1S/C98H138N24O33/c1-5-52(4)82(96(153)122-39-15-23-70(122)92(149)114-60(30-34-79(134)135)85(142)111-59(29-33-78(132)133)86(143)116-64(43-55-24-26-56(123)27-25-55)89(146)118-67(97(154)155)40-51(2)3)119-87(144)61(31-35-80(136)137)112-84(141)58(28-32-77(130)131)113-88(145)63(42-54-18-10-7-11-19-54)117-90(147)66(45-81(138)139)110-76(129)50-107-83(140)65(44-71(100)124)109-75(128)49-106-73(126)47-104-72(125)46-105-74(127)48-108-91(148)68-21-13-38-121(68)95(152)62(20-12-36-103-98(101)102)115-93(150)69-22-14-37-120(69)94(151)57(99)41-53-16-8-6-9-17-53/h6-11,16-19,24-27,51-52,57-70,82,123H,5,12-15,20-23,28-50,99H2,1-4H3,(H2,100,124)(H,104,125)(H,105,127)(H,106,126)(H,107,140)(H,108,148)(H,109,128)(H,110,129)(H,111,142)(H,112,141)(H,113,145)(H,114,149)(H,115,150)(H,116,143)(H,117,147)(H,118,146)(H,119,144)(H,130,131)(H,132,133)(H,134,135)(H,136,137)(H,138,139)(H,154,155)(H4,101,102,103)/t52-,57+,58-,59-,60-,61-,62-,63-,64-,65-,66-,67-,68-,69-,70-,82-/m0/s1; Key:OIRCOABEOLEUMC-GEJPAHFPSA-N

Bivalirudin, sold under the brand names Angiomax and Angiox, among others, is a specific and reversible direct thrombin inhibitor (DTI). Chemically, it is a synthetic congener of the naturally occurring drug hirudin, found in the saliva of the medicinal leech Hirudo medicinalis. It is manufactured by The Medicines Company.

Bivalirudin lacks many of the limitations seen with indirect thrombin inhibitors, such as heparin. A short, synthetic peptide, it is a potent and highly specific inhibitor of thrombin that inhibits both circulating and clot-bound thrombin, while also inhibiting thrombin-mediated platelet activation and aggregation. Bivalirudin has a quick onset of action and a short half-life. It does not bind to plasma proteins (other than thrombin) or to red blood cells. Therefore, it has a predictable antithrombotic response. There is no risk for heparin-induced thrombocytopenia or heparin-induced thrombosis-thrombocytopenia syndrome. It does not require a binding cofactor such as antithrombin and does not activate platelets. These characteristics make bivalirudin an ideal alternative to heparin.

Bivalirudin clinical studies demonstrated consistent positive outcomes in patients with stable angina, unstable angina (UA), non–ST-segment elevation myocardial infarction (NSTEMI), and ST-segment elevation myocardial infarction (STEMI) undergoing PCI in seven major randomized trials. Patients receiving bivalirudin had fewer adverse events compared to patients that received heparin.

== Medical uses ==
=== United States ===
- Bivalirudin is indicated for use as an anticoagulant in patients with unstable angina undergoing percutaneous transluminal coronary angioplasty (PTCA).
- Bivalirudin with provisional use of glycoprotein IIb/IIIa inhibitor (GPI) is indicated for use as an anticoagulant in patients undergoing percutaneous coronary intervention (PCI).
- Bivalirudin is indicated for patients with, or at risk of HIT/HITTS undergoing PCI.
- Bivalirudin is intended for use with aspirin and has been studied only in patients receiving concomitant aspirin

=== European Union ===
- Percutaneous Coronary Intervention (PCI), including patients with ST-segment elevation myocardial infarction (STEMI) undergoing primary PCI.
- Bivalirudin is also indicated for the treatment of adult patients with unstable angina/non-ST segment elevation myocardial infarction (UA/NSTEMI) planned for urgent or early intervention.
- Bivalirudin should be administered with aspirin and clopidogrel.

== Pharmacology ==
=== Mechanism of action ===
Bivalirudin directly inhibits thrombin by specifically binding both to the catalytic site and to the anion-binding exosite of circulating and clot-bound thrombin. Thrombin is a serine proteinase that plays a central role in the thrombotic process. It cleaves fibrinogen into fibrin monomers, activates Factor V, VIII, and XIII, allowing fibrin to develop a covalently cross-linked framework that stabilizes the thrombus. Thrombin also promotes further thrombin generation, and activates platelets, stimulating aggregation and granule release. The binding of bivalirudin to thrombin is reversible as thrombin slowly cleaves the bivalirudin-Arg_{3}-Pro_{4} bond, resulting in recovery of thrombin active site functions.

=== Pharmacokinetics ===
- Following an IV bolus of bivalirudin of 1 mg/kg and a 4-hour 2.5 mg/kg/h IV infusion a mean steady state concentration of 12.3 ± 1.7 μg/mL is achieved
- Bivalirudin is cleared from plasma by a combination of renal mechanisms and proteolytic cleavage
- Half-life:

-Normal renal function (≥ 90 mL/min) = 25 minutes

-Mild renal dysfunction (60–89 mL/min) = 22 minutes

-Moderate renal dysfunction (30-59 mL/min) = 34 minutes

-Severe renal dysfunction (≤ 29 mL/min) = 57 minutes

-Dialysis-dependent = 3.5 hours

- Clearance is reduced approximately 20% in patients with moderate and severe renal impairment and by 80% in dialysis-dependent patients
- Bivalirudin is hemodialyzable and approximately 25% is cleared by hemodialysis.

Pharmacodynamics

Coagulation times return to baseline approximately 1 hour following cessation of bivalirudin administration.

== Chemistry ==
Bivalirudin is a 20 amino acid long peptide with the sequence D-Phe-Pro-Arg-Pro-Gly-Gly-Gly-Gly-Asn-Gly-Asp-Phe-Glu-Glu-Ile-Pro-Glu-Glu-Tyr-Leu (FPRPGGGGNGDFEEIPEEYL), where the first residue is D-phenylalanine instead of the natural L-phenylalanine.

== Safety information ==
Bivalirudin is contraindicated in patients with active major bleeding and hypersensitivity to bivalirudin or its components. (In the EU bivalirudin is also contraindicated in patients with an increased risk of bleeding due to hemostasis disorders and/or irreversible coagulation disorders, severe uncontrolled hypertension, subacute bacterial endocarditis, and severe renal impairment [GFR<30 ml/min] and in dialysis-dependent patients).

Bivalirudin is an anticoagulant. Therefore, bleeding is an expected adverse event. In clinical trials, bivalirudin treated patients exhibited statistically significantly lower rates of bleeding than patients treated with heparin plus a GP IIb/IIIa inhibitor. The most common (≥10%) adverse events of bivalirudin are back pain, pain, nausea, headache, and hypotension.

== Pediatric experience ==
The U.S. Food and Drug Administration (FDA) granted pediatric exclusivity for bivalirudin, based on studies submitted in response to a written request by the FDA to investigate the use of bivalirudin in pediatric patients aged birth to 16-years old.

The submission was based on a prospective, open-label, multi-center, single arm study evaluating bivalirudin as a procedural anticoagulant in the pediatric population undergoing intravascular procedures for congenital heart disease.

Study outcomes suggest that the pharmacokinetic (PK) and pharmacodynamic (PD) response of bivalirudin in the pediatric population is predictable and behaves in a manner similar to that in adults.

== Comparative results ==
Bivalirudin is supported by several major randomized trials. These trials include REPLACE-2 (Randomized Evaluation of PCI Linking Angiomax to Reduced Clinical Events-2), BAT (Bivalirudin Angioplasty Trial), ACUITY (Acute Catheterization and Urgent Intervention Triage Strategy Trial), and HORIZONS AMI (Harmonizing Outcomes With Revascularization and Stents in AMI). A total of 25,000 patients with a low to high risk for ischemic complications undergoing PCI were evaluated. Bivalirudin with or without provisional GPIIb/IIIa demonstrated similar angiographic and procedural outcomes and improved clinical outcomes when compared with heparin plus GPIIb/IIIa.

HORIZONS-AMI

HORIZONS AMI was a prospective, randomized, open-label, double-arm multicenter trial in STEMI patients undergoing primary PCI.

30 Day Results

- The incidence of net adverse clinical events (9.2% vs. 12.1%) and major bleeding (4.9% vs. 8.3%) was significantly reduced by bivalirudin monotherapy versus unfractionated heparin (UFH) plus a GP IIb/IIIa inhibitor with similar rates of major adverse cardiovascular events (5.4 vs. 5.5%) at 30 days.
- A significant reduction in the rate of cardiac mortality in patients treated with bivalirudin monotherapy versus UFH plus a GP IIb/IIIa inhibitor was observed (1.8% vs. 2.9%) at 30 days.
- Patients receiving Angiomax monotherapy had similar rates of overall stent thrombosis (Academic Research Consortium (ARC) definition) at 30 days versus UFH plus a GP IIb/IIIa inhibitor (2.5% vs. 1.9%), with the exception of acute stent thrombosis (<24 hours), which was higher for the bivalirudin-treated patients at 1.3% vs 0.3% for the UFH-GP IIb/IIIa-inhibitor-treated patients.

1-Year Results

- At 1-year follow-up, a reduction in the incidence of net adverse clinical events (15.7% vs. 18.3%) and major bleeding (5.8% vs. 4.9%) was maintained in the bivalirudin monotherapy group versus UFH plus a GP IIb/IIIa inhibitor group, with no difference in the rate of major adverse cardiovascular events (11.9% vs. 11.9%)
- A significant reduction in the rate of cardiac mortality in patients treated with bivalirudin monotherapy versus UFH plus a GP IIb/IIIa inhibitor was maintained at 1 year in the HORIZONS AMI trial (2.1% vs. 3.8%)The incidence of stent thrombosis at 1 year was also similar between the 2 treatment groups (3.5% in the Angiomax group vs. 3.2% in the UFH plus GP IIb/IIIa inhibitor group).

2-Year Results

- At 2-year follow-up, a reduction in the incidence of net adverse clinical events (22.3% vs. 24.8%) and major bleeding (6.4% vs. 9.6%) was maintained in the bivalirudin monotherapy group versus UFH plus a GP IIb/IIIa inhibitor group, with no difference in the rate of major adverse cardiovascular events (18.7% vs. 18.8%)
- A significant reduction in the rate of cardiac mortality in patients treated with bivalirudin monotherapy versus UFH plus a GP IIb/IIIa inhibitor was maintained at 2 year in the HORIZONS AMI trial (2.5% vs. 4.2%)
- At 2-year follow-up, treatment with bivalirudin monotherapy resulted in a 25% reduction in all-cause mortality, representing 15 lives saved per 1000 patients treated (number needed to treat [NNT] = 67 to save 1 life).
- The incidence of stent thrombosis (ARC definite/probable) at 2 years was also similar between the 2 treatment groups (4.6% in the Angiomax group vs. 4.3% in the UFH plus GP IIb/IIIa inhibitor group).

ACUITY

ACUITY was a large multicenter, prospective, open-label, 3-arm trial designed to establish the optimal antithrombotic treatment regimens in patients with UA/NSTEMI undergoing early invasive management.

30-Day Results

- Bivalirudin monotherapy provided superior net clinical outcomes compared to any heparin regimen with GP IIb/IIIa inhibitor (10.1% vs 11.7%) at 30 days.
- The incidence of ACUITY scale major bleeding (non-CABG) was decreased significantly by 47% in the bivalirudin monotherapy group vs the heparin with GP IIb/IIIa inhibitor group (3.0% vs 5.7%) at 30 days.

1-Year Results

- Bivalirudin alone demonstrated no difference in the rates of composite ischemic complications (death, MI, unplanned revascularization for ischemia) versus heparin with GP IIb/IIIa inhibition (16.4% vs 16.3%) at 12 months.

REPLACE-2

REPLACE-2 was a multicenter, double-blind, triple-dummy randomized clinical trial in patients with low to moderate risk for ischemic complications undergoing PCI.

30 Days

- The incidence of net adverse clinical events (9.2% vs. 10.0%) and major adverse cardiovascular events (7.6% vs. 7.1%) was reduced by bivalirudin monotherapy versus unfractionated heparin (UFH) plus a GP IIb/IIIa inhibitor with significant reduction in rates of major bleeding (2.4 vs. 4.1%) at 30 days.

1-Year Results

- Differences in mortality favoring bivalirudin at 30 days and 6 months was maintained at 12 months and demonstrated a 24% risk reduction in death compared to heparin plus GP IIb/IIIa inhibition.

BAT

The Phase III Bivalirudin Angioplasty Trial (BAT) was a randomized, prospective, double blind, multicenter study in patients with unstable angina undergoing PTCA.

- The composite endpoint of death, MI or revascularization occurred in 6.2% of patients treated with bivalirudin and in 7.9% of patients treated with heparin.
- Significant reductions in clinical events were maintained at 90 days with absolute benefits being sustained through 180 days.
- The incidence of major hemorrhage for the entire hospitalization period in patients assigned bivalirudin was 3.7% compared to 9.3% in patients randomized to heparin.

== Guidelines ==
Bivalirudin has Class I recommendations in multiple national guidelines.

US guidelines

Patient Type	Guidelines	Recommendations
STEMI and primary PCI	ACC/AHA/SCAI 2009 Joint STEMI/PCI Focused Update	Class I-B, IIa-B
UA/NSTEMI	ACC/AHA 2007 guidelines for UA/NSTEMI patients	Class I-B, IIa-B
NSTE-ACS patients	ACCP 2008 clinical practice guidelines for patients with NSTE-ACS	Grade 1A, 2B
PCI	ACCP 2008 clinical practice guidelines for patients with NSTE-ACS	Grade 1B

EU guidelines

Patient Type	Guidelines	Recommendations
STEMI	European Society of Cardiology 2008	Class IIa – B
NSTE-ACS	European Society of Cardiology 2007	Class IIa-B, IB
PCI	European Society of Cardiology 2005	Class IIa C, IC
