= Heparin-induced thrombocytopenia =

Low platelet count due to heparin, associated with a risk of thrombosis

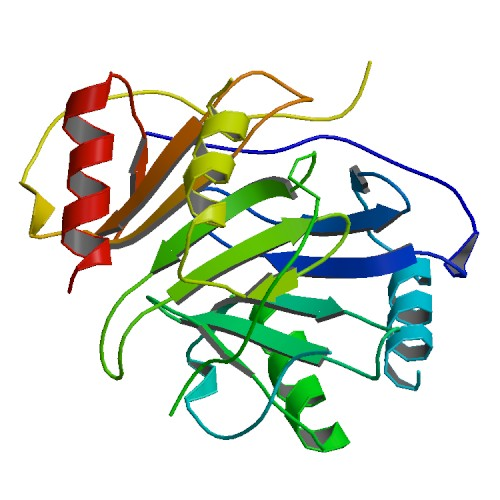
- A schematic drawing of platelet factor 4, which when bound to heparin leads to an immune response in HIT
- Specialty: Hematology

Heparin-induced thrombocytopenia (HIT) is the development of thrombocytopenia (a low platelet count), due to the administration of various forms of heparin, an anticoagulant. HIT predisposes to thrombosis (the abnormal formation of blood clots inside a blood vessel). When thrombosis is identified the condition is called heparin-induced thrombocytopenia and thrombosis (HITT). HIT is caused by the formation of abnormal antibodies that activate platelets, which release microparticles that activate thrombin, leading to thrombosis. If someone receiving heparin develops new or worsening thrombosis, or if the platelet count falls, HIT can be confirmed with specific blood tests.

The treatment of HIT requires stopping heparin treatment, and both protection from thrombosis and choice of an agent that will not reduce the platelet count any further. Several alternatives are available for this purpose; mainly used are danaparoid, fondaparinux, argatroban, and bivalirudin.

While purified heparin was first used in humans in the 1930s, HIT was not reported until the 1960s.

== Signs and symptoms ==
Heparin may be used for both prevention and the treatment of thrombosis. It exists in two main forms: an "unfractionated" form that can be injected under the skin (subcutaneously) or through an intravenous infusion, and a "low molecular weight" form that is generally given subcutaneously. Commonly used low molecular weight heparins are enoxaparin, dalteparin, nadroparin and tinzaparin.

In HIT, the platelet count in the blood falls below the normal range, a condition called thrombocytopenia. However, it is generally not low enough to lead to an increased risk of bleeding. Most people with HIT, therefore, do not experience any symptoms. Typically, the platelet count falls 5–14 days after heparin is first given; if someone has received heparin in the previous three months, the fall in platelet count may occur sooner, sometimes within a day.

The most common symptom of HIT is enlargement or extension of a previously diagnosed blood clot, or the development of a new blood clot elsewhere in the body. This may take the form of clots either in arteries or veins, causing arterial or venous thrombosis, respectively. Examples of arterial thrombosis are stroke, myocardial infarction ("heart attack"), and acute leg ischemia. Venous thrombosis may occur in the leg or arm in the form of deep vein thrombosis (DVT) and in the lung in the form of a pulmonary embolism (PE); the latter usually originates in the leg, but migrates to the lung.

In those receiving heparin through an intravenous infusion, a complex of symptoms ("systemic reaction") may occur when the infusion is started. These include fever, chills, high blood pressure, a fast heart rate, shortness of breath, and chest pain. This happens in about a quarter of people with HIT. Others may develop a skin rash consisting of red spots.

== Mechanism ==
The administration of heparin can cause the development of HIT antibodies, suggesting heparin may act as a hapten, thus may be targeted by the immune system. In HIT, the immune system forms antibodies against heparin when it is bound to a protein called platelet factor 4 (PF4). These antibodies are usually of the IgG class and their development usually takes about five days. However, those who have been exposed to heparin in the last few months may still have circulating IgG, as IgG-type antibodies generally continue to be produced even when their precipitant has been removed. This is similar to immunity against certain microorganisms, with the difference that the HIT antibody does not persist more than three months. HIT antibodies have been found in individuals with thrombocytopenia and thrombosis who had no prior exposure to heparin, but the majority are found in people who are receiving heparin.

The IgG antibodies form a complex with heparin and PF4 in the bloodstream. The tail of the antibody then binds to the FcγIIa receptor, a protein on the surface of the platelet. This results in platelet activation and the formation of platelet microparticles, which initiate the formation of blood clots; the platelet count falls as a result, leading to thrombocytopenia. In addition, the reticuloendothelial system (mostly the spleen) removes the antibody-coated platelets, further contributing to the thrombocytopenia.

Formation of PF4-heparin antibodies is common in people receiving heparin, but only a proportion of these develop thrombocytopenia or thrombosis. This has been referred to as an "iceberg phenomenon".

== Diagnosis ==
HIT may be suspected if blood tests show a falling platelet count in someone receiving heparin, even if the heparin has already been discontinued. Professional guidelines recommend that people receiving heparin have a complete blood count (which includes a platelet count) on a regular basis while receiving heparin.

However, not all people with a falling platelet count while receiving heparin turn out to have HIT. The timing, severity of the thrombocytopenia, the occurrence of new thrombosis, and the presence of alternative explanations, all determine the likelihood that HIT is present. A commonly used score to predict the likelihood of HIT is the "4 Ts" score introduced in 2003. A score of 0–8 points is generated; if the score is 0–3, HIT is unlikely. A score of 4–5 indicates intermediate probability, while a score of 6–8 makes it highly likely. Those with a high score may need to be treated with an alternative drug, while more sensitive and specific tests for HIT are performed, while those with a low score can safely continue receiving heparin, as the likelihood that they have HIT is extremely low. In an analysis of the reliability of the 4T score, a low score had a negative predictive value of 0.998, while an intermediate score had a positive predictive value of 0.14 and a high score a positive predictive value of 0.64; intermediate and high scores, therefore, warrant further investigation.

Element	The 4T score for heparin-induced thrombocytopenia
Thrombocytopenia	2 points if the fall in platelet count is >50% of the previous value, AND the lowest count (nadir) is 20–100 billion/liter 1 point if the fall is 30–50% or the nadir is 10–19 billion/liter No points if the fall is less than 30% or the nadir is <10 billion/liter.
Timing	2 points if the fall is between days 5–10 after commencement of treatment 1 point if the fall is after day 10. If someone has been exposed to heparin within the last 30 days and then has a drop in platelet count within a day of reexposure, 2 points are given. If the previous exposure was 30–100 days ago, 1 point If the fall is early but there has been no previous heparin exposure, no points.
Thrombosis	2 points in new proven thrombosis, skin necrosis (see below), or systemic reaction 1 point if progressive or recurrent thrombosis, silent thrombosis or red skin lesions No points if there are no symptoms.
Alternative cause possible	2 points if no other cause 1 point if there is a possible alternative cause No points if there is a definite alternative cause.

The first screening test in someone suspected of having HIT is aimed at detecting antibodies against heparin-PF4 complexes. This may be with a laboratory test of the enzyme-linked immunosorbent assay type. This ELISA test, however, detects all circulating antibodies that bind heparin-PF4 complexes, and may also falsely identify antibodies that do not cause HIT. Therefore, those with a positive ELISA are tested further with a functional assay. This test uses platelets and serum from the patient; the platelets are washed and mixed with serum and heparin. The sample is then tested for the release of serotonin, a marker of platelet activation. If this serotonin release assay (SRA) shows high serotonin release, the diagnosis of HIT is confirmed. The SRA test is difficult to perform and is usually only done in regional laboratories.

If someone has been diagnosed with HIT, some recommend routine Doppler sonography of the leg veins to identify deep vein thromboses, as this is very common in HIT.

== Treatment ==
Molecular structure of argatroban, a direct thrombin inhibitor used as an alternative to heparin in HIT

Given the fact that HIT predisposes strongly to new episodes of thrombosis, simply discontinuing the heparin administration is insufficient. Generally, an alternative anticoagulant is needed to suppress the thrombotic tendency while the generation of antibodies stops and the platelet count recovers. To make matters more complicated, the other most commonly used anticoagulant, warfarin, should not be used in HIT until the platelet count is at least 150 billion/L because a very high risk of warfarin necrosis exists in people with HIT who have low platelet counts. Warfarin necrosis is the development of skin gangrene in those receiving warfarin or a similar vitamin K inhibitor. If the patient was receiving warfarin at the time when HIT is diagnosed, the activity of warfarin is reversed with vitamin K. Transfusing platelets is discouraged, as a theoretical risk indicates that this may worsen the risk of thrombosis; the platelet count is rarely low enough to be the principal cause of significant hemorrhage.

Various nonheparin agents are used as alternatives to heparin therapy to provide anticoagulation in those with strongly suspected or proven HIT: danaparoid, fondaparinux, bivalirudin, and argatroban. Not all agents are available in all countries, and not all are approved for this specific use. For instance, argatroban is only recently licensed in the United Kingdom, and danaparoid is not available in the United States. Fondaparinux, a factor Xa inhibitor, is commonly used off label for HIT treatment in the United States.

According to a systematic review, people with HIT treated with lepirudin showed a relative risk reduction of clinical outcome (death, amputation, etc.) to be 0.52 and 0.42 when compared to patient controls. In addition, people treated with argatroban for HIT showed a relative risk reduction of the above clinical outcomes to be 0.20 and 0.18. Lepirudin production stopped on May 31, 2012.

== Epidemiology ==
Up to 8% of patients receiving heparin are at risk to develop HIT antibodies, but only 1–5% on heparin will progress to develop HIT with thrombocytopenia and subsequently one-third of them may develop arterial or venous thrombosis. After vascular surgery, 34% of patients receiving heparin developed HIT antibodies without clinical symptoms. The exact number of cases of HIT in the general population is unknown. What is known is that women receiving heparin after a recent surgical procedure, particularly cardiothoracic surgery, have a higher risk, while the risk is very low in women just before and after giving birth. HIT is less common in those receiving low molecular weight heparin compared to unfractionated heparin.

== History ==
While heparin was introduced for clinical use in the late 1930s, new thrombosis in people treated with heparin was not described until 1957, when vascular surgeons reported the association. The fact that this phenomenon occurred together with thrombocytopenia was reported in 1969; prior to this time, platelet counts were not routinely performed. A 1973 report established HIT as a diagnosis, as well as suggesting that its features were the result of an immune process.

Initially, various theories existed about the exact cause of the low platelets in HIT. Gradually, evidence accumulated on the exact underlying mechanism. In 1984–1986, John G. Kelton and colleagues at McMaster University Medical School developed the laboratory tests that could be used to confirm or exclude heparin-induced thrombocytopenia.

Treatment was initially limited to aspirin and warfarin, but the 1990s saw the introduction of a number of agents that could provide anticoagulation without a risk of recurrent HIT. Older terminology distinguishes between two forms of heparin-induced thrombocytopenia: type 1 (mild, nonimmune mediated and self-limiting fall in platelet count) and type 2, the form described above. Currently, the term HIT is used without a modifier to describe the immune-mediated severe form.

In 2021 a condition resembling HIT but without heparin exposure was described to explain unusual post-vaccination embolic and thrombotic events after the Oxford–AstraZeneca COVID-19 vaccine. It is a rare adverse event (1:1 million to 1:100,000) resulting from COVID-19 vaccines (particularly adenoviral vector vaccines). This is also known as thrombosis with thrombocytopenia syndrome or TTS.
