= Argatroban =

Pharmaceutical drug

Clinical data
- AHFS/Drugs.com: Monograph
- License data: US DailyMed: Argatroban
- Routes of administration: Intravenous
- ATC code: B01AE03 (WHO)

Legal status
- Legal status: CA: ℞-only; US: ℞-only

Pharmacokinetic data
- Bioavailability: 100% (intravenous)
- Protein binding: 54%
- Metabolism: hepatic
- Elimination half-life: 39 and 51 minutes

Identifiers
- IUPAC name: (2R,4R)-1-[(2S)-5-(diaminomethylideneamino)-2- [[(3R)-3-methyl-1,2,3,4-tetrahydroquinolin-8-yl] sulfonylamino]pentanoyl]-4-methyl-piperidine-2- carboxylic acid
- CAS Number: 74863-84-6
- PubChem CID: 440542
- DrugBank: DB00278
- ChemSpider: 389444
- UNII: OCY3U280Y3
- KEGG: C04931
- ChEMBL: ChEMBL1166
- CompTox Dashboard (EPA): DTXSID7046467
- ECHA InfoCard: 100.166.378

Chemical and physical data
- Formula: C_{23}H_{36}N_{6}O_{5}S
- Molar mass: 508.64 g·mol^{−1}
- 3D model (JSmol): Interactive image
- SMILES: O=C(O)[C@@H]3N(C(=O)C(NS(=O)(=O)c1cccc2c1NCC(C2)C)CCC/N=C(\N)N)CC[C@@H](C)C3
- InChI: InChI=1S/C23H36N6O5S/c1-14-8-10-29(18(12-14)22(31)32)21(30)17(6-4-9-26-23(24)25)28-35(33,34)19-7-3-5-16-11-15(2)13-27-20(16)19/h3,5,7,14-15,17-18,27-28H,4,6,8-13H2,1-2H3,(H,31,32)(H4,24,25,26)/t14-,15?,17+,18-/m1/s1; Key:KXNPVXPOPUZYGB-IOVMHBDKSA-N

Argatroban is an anticoagulant that is a small molecule direct thrombin inhibitor. In 2000, argatroban was licensed by the US Food and Drug Administration (FDA) for prophylaxis or treatment of thrombosis in people with heparin-induced thrombocytopenia (HIT). In 2002, it was approved for use during percutaneous coronary interventions in people who have HIT or are at risk for developing it. In 2012, it was approved by the UK Medicines and Healthcare products Regulatory Agency for anticoagulation in people with heparin-induced thrombocytopenia Type II (HIT) who require parenteral antithrombotic therapy.

Argatroban is given intravenously and drug plasma concentrations reach steady state in 1–3 hours. Argatroban is metabolized in the liver and has a half-life of about 50 minutes. It is monitored by PTT. Because of its hepatic metabolism, it may be used in patients with renal dysfunction. (This is in contrast to lepirudin, a direct thrombin inhibitor that is primarily renally cleared).

== Transitioning to warfarin in individuals with heparin-induced thrombocytopenia ==
Argatroban is used as an anticoagulant in individuals with thrombosis and heparin-induced thrombocytopenia. Often these individuals require long-term anticoagulation. If warfarin is chosen as the long-term anticoagulant, this poses particular challenges due to the falsely elevated prothrombin time and INR caused by argatroban. The combination of argatroban and warfarin may raise the INR to greater than 5.0 without a significant increased risk of bleeding complications. One solution to this problem is to measure the chromogenic factor X level. A level < 40–45% typically indicates that the INR will be therapeutic (2–3) when the argatroban is discontinued.
