= Danaparoid =

Anticoagulant drug

Clinical data
- Trade names: Orgaran
- AHFS/Drugs.com: Micromedex Detailed Consumer Information
- MedlinePlus: a602007
- ATC code: B01AB09 (WHO)

Identifiers
- CAS Number: 308068-55-5
- DrugBank: DB06754
- ChemSpider: none
- UNII: BI6GY4U9CW
- ChEMBL: ChEMBL1201684

Danaparoid sodium (Orgaran) is an anticoagulant with an antithrombotic action due to inhibition of thrombin generation (TGI) by two mechanisms: indirect inactivation of Factor Xa via AT and direct inhibition of thrombin activation of Factor IX (an important feedback loop for thrombin generation). It also possesses a minor anti-thrombin activity, mediated equally via AT and Heparin Co-factor II producing a ratio of anti-Xa:IIa activity >22. [Meuleman DG. Haemostasis 1992;22:58-65 and Ofosu FA Haemostasis 1992;22:66-72]

Danaparoid is a low molecular weight heparinoid devoid of heparin. It consists of a mixture of heparan sulfate, dermatan sulfate, and chondroitin sulfate. It is chemically distinct from heparin, has different protein-binding properties because of its low degree of sulphation and low surface charge density and thus has little cross-reactivity in heparin-intolerant patients.

The TGI activity, considered by Fernandes et al. [Thromb Haemostas 1987;57/3:286-93] to provide an index of antithrombotic potential, of danaparoid has a half-life of 6.7 hours.

== Uses ==
It is used to prevent deep venous clots, particularly in situations with a high risk of clot formation, such as after hip surgery.

It is also used as a heparin substitute in heparin-induced thrombocytopenia (HIT) which may otherwise cause paradoxical thrombosis. Danaparoid is used for thrombosis prophylaxis and treatment in heparin-induced thrombocytopenia patients. Although pre-treatment serological cross-reactivity with heparin-induced antibodies can occur in 5.2% of the patients it bears no systematic relationship with clinical cross-reactivity, 3.2% in the same study of 1478 patients with acute HIT [Magnani & Gallus Thromb Haemost 2006;95:967-81] (ESRA).

It is also approved for the treatment of disseminated intravascular coagulation in Japan and although not approved for the following it has shown efficacy and safety in 406 case reports of paediatric use [Bidlingmaier et al. Acta Haematologica 2006;115:237-247], pregnancy [see Magnani HN. Thromb Res 2010;125:297-302] 197 cases & 81 additional uses to protect cesarian section, patients in renal failure requiring intermittent [Magnani HN. Thromb Res 2010;125:e171-e176] or continuous (CVVRT) [Magnani HN & Wester JPJ. Open access Scientific Reports 2012;1/9:423-9] renal replacement therapy and in patients with hepatic disorders associated with cirrhosis such as portal vein thrombosis [Fujiyama et al. BMC Gatsroenterol 2017;17:112-20] and the sinusoidal obstruction syndrome [Kato et al. Pediatr Transplant 2017;e13099] and thrombotic micro-angiopathy [Machida et al. Bone Marrow Transplant 2016;1-3 Doi:10.1038/bmt.2016.270] that occur after haemopoietic stem-cell transplantation in patients with haematogenous and solid malignancies.

It has also been used in Kasabach–Merritt syndrome in 3 cases.

Current research also investigates the use of Danaparoid, which can be incorporated into hollow fiber membranes to improve their hemocompatibility and reduce the formation of blood clots in the lumen of the fibers.

== Discontinuation ==
On August 14, 2002, this drug was withdrawn by Organon International. from the US market, due to a shortage in drug substance. The manufacturer has continued providing the medication in all other locales where it is approved for marketing.

The drug is now owned and distributed by Aspen Pharma.

== Administration ==
IV and SC

== Side effects ==
- Bleeding (solely restricted to patients undergoing cardio-pulmonmary surgery with by pass)<Magnani HN, Gallus AG. Heparin-induced thrombocytopenia (HIT) A report of 1478 clinical outcomes of patients treated with danaparoid (Orgaran) from 1982 to mid 2004." Thromb Haemost 2006; 95: 967-871> found in 4.6% of medical patients, 6.1% after major general and vascular surgery, but 42.3% after CPBS (due to lack of an effective antidote) for which it is now contraindicated.
- Low platelets, due to a low level of structural similarity between danaparoid and heparin, i.e.only in some patients sensitive to heparin or a LMWH but to date never developed spontaneously. Platelet count recovery was more frequent than in the control group in 2 comparative studies in patients with HIT [Chong et al. Thromb Haemost 2001;86:1170-1175 and Lubenow et al. Thromb Res 2006;117:507-15]
- Possibly Asthma exacerbations, due to allergies to sulfites contained within the medicine (no case has been reported to date).
