= Platelet factor 4 =

Protein involved in blood clotting, wound healing and inflammation

PF4
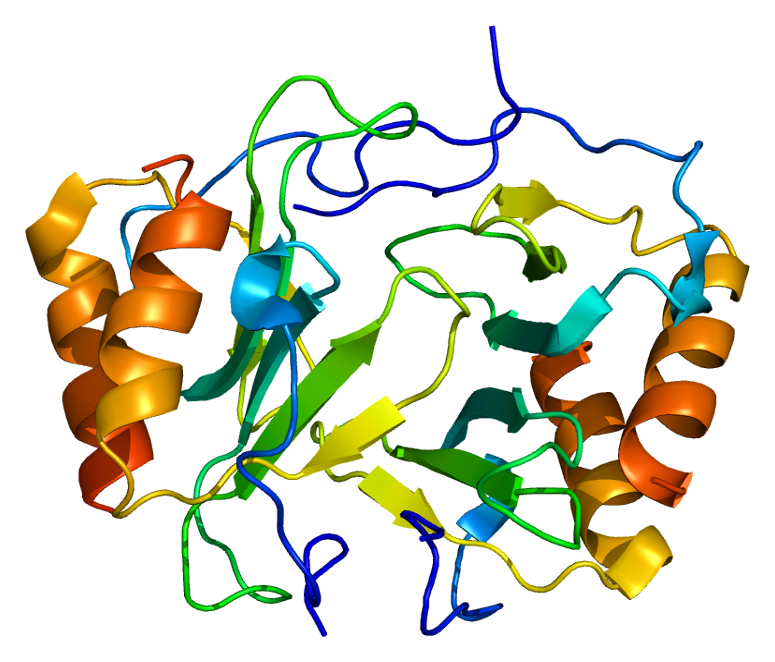

Identifiers
- Aliases: PF4, CXCL4, PF-4, SCYB4, platelet factor 4
- External IDs: OMIM: 173460; MGI: 1888711; GeneCards: PF4
Available structures
PDB	Ortholog search: PDBe RCSB
PDB	List of PDB id codes 1RHP, 1DN3, 1F9Q, 1F9R, 1F9S, 1PFM, 1PFN, 4R9W, 4R9Y, 4RAU

Gene location (Human)
Chr.	Chromosome 4 (human)
Band	4q13.3	Start	73,980,811 bp
Band	4q13.3	End	73,982,027 bp

Gene location (Mouse)
Chr.	Chromosome 5 (mouse)
Band	5|5 E1	Start	90,920,294 bp
Band	5|5 E1	End	90,921,242 bp
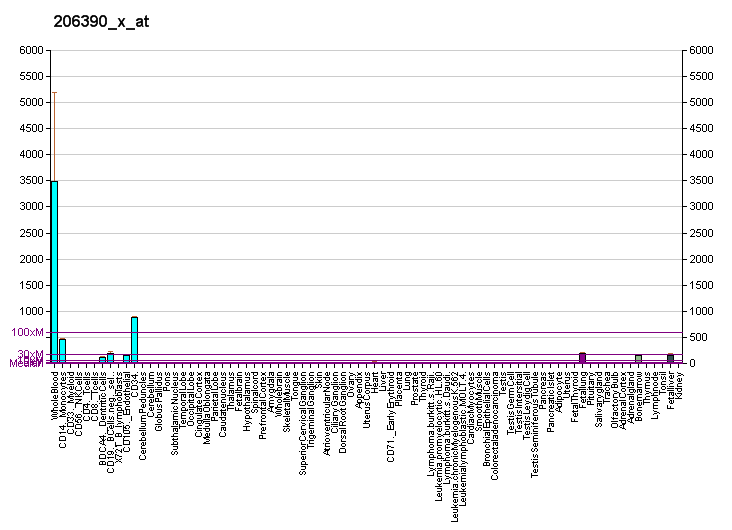
RNA expression pattern
Bgee	Human / Mouse (ortholog); Top expressed in: monocyte; trabecular bone; granulocyte; blood; gonad; bone marrow; testicle; bone marrow cell; periodontal fiber; spleen / Top expressed in: tibiofemoral joint; blood; sciatic nerve; stroma of bone marrow; fetal liver hematopoietic progenitor cell; dermis; ankle; vestibular sensory epithelium; carotid body; spleen; More reference expression data
BioGPS	More reference expression data
Gene ontology
Molecular function	cytokine activity; heparin binding; CXCR3 chemokine receptor binding; chemokine activity; protein binding
Cellular component	extracellular region; platelet alpha granule lumen; extracellular space; cytoplasm; collagen-containing extracellular matrix
Biological process	cytokine-mediated signaling pathway; chemokine-mediated signaling pathway; positive regulation of macrophage differentiation; platelet degranulation; negative regulation of megakaryocyte differentiation; positive regulation of cAMP-mediated signaling; negative regulation of MHC class II biosynthetic process; leukocyte chemotaxis; chemotaxis; response to lipopolysaccharide; positive regulation of macrophage derived foam cell differentiation; positive regulation of gene expression; regulation of cell population proliferation; immune response; positive regulation of tumor necrosis factor production; negative regulation of angiogenesis; negative regulation of extrinsic apoptotic signaling pathway in absence of ligand; inflammatory response; positive regulation of transcription by RNA polymerase II; negative regulation of cytolysis; platelet activation; defense response; positive regulation of neutrophil chemotaxis; antimicrobial humoral immune response mediated by antimicrobial peptide; regulation of megakaryocyte differentiation; regulation of signaling receptor activity; G protein-coupled receptor signaling pathway; adenylate cyclase-activating G protein-coupled receptor signaling pathway; neutrophil chemotaxis; cellular response to lipopolysaccharide
Sources:Amigo / QuickGO
Orthologs
Databases	NCBI: entry; OMA: entry
Species	Human	Mouse
Entrez	5196	56744
Ensembl	ENSG00000163737	ENSMUSG00000029373
UniProt	P02776	Q9Z126
RefSeq (mRNA)	NM_002619; NM_001363352	NM_019932
RefSeq (protein)	NP_002610; NP_001350281	NP_064316
Location (UCSC)	Chr 4: 73.98 – 73.98 Mb	Chr 5: 90.92 – 90.92 Mb
PubMed search
- Wikidata
View/Edit Human	View/Edit Mouse

Platelet factor 4 (PF4) is a small cytokine belonging to the CXC chemokine family that is also known as chemokine (C-X-C motif) ligand 4 (CXCL4) . This chemokine is released from alpha-granules of activated platelets during platelet aggregation, and promotes blood coagulation by moderating the effects of heparin-like molecules. Due to these roles, it is predicted to play a role in wound repair and inflammation. It is usually found in a complex with proteoglycan.

== Genomics ==
The gene for human PF4 is located on human chromosome 4.

== Function ==
Platelet factor-4 is a 70-amino acid protein that is released from the alpha-granules of activated platelets and binds with high affinity to heparin. Its major physiologic role appears to be neutralization of heparin-like molecules on the endothelial surface of blood vessels, thereby inhibiting local antithrombin activity and promoting coagulation. As a strong chemoattractant for neutrophils and fibroblasts, PF4 probably has a role in inflammation and wound repair.

PF4 is chemotactic for neutrophils, fibroblasts and monocytes, and interacts with a splice variant of the chemokine receptor CXCR3, known as CXCR3-B.

== Clinical significance ==
=== Antibodies ===
There are a set of prothrombotic conditions caused by monoclonal antibodies against Platelet factor 4 (anti-PF4) that presents with recurrent thrombosis and persistent thrombocytopenia. At least one author has called these Monoclonal gammopathy of thrombotic significance.

The heparin:PF4 complex is the antigen in heparin-induced thrombocytopenia (HIT), an idiosyncratic autoimmune reaction to the administration of the anticoagulant heparin. PF4 autoantibodies have also been found in patients with thrombosis and features resembling HIT but no prior administration of heparin.

Antibodies against PF4 have been implicated in cases of thrombosis and thrombocytopenia subsequent to vaccination with the Oxford–AstraZeneca or the Janssen COVID-19 vaccine. This phenomenon has been termed vaccine-induced immune thrombotic thrombocytopenia (VITT).

=== Expression changes ===
Changes in the expression of PF4 have been associated with symptoms of long COVID.

It is increased in patients with systemic sclerosis that also have interstitial lung disease.

=== Malaria ===
The human platelet factor 4 kills malaria parasites within erythrocytes by selectively lysing the parasite's digestive vacuole.

== See also ==
- Platelet-activating factor
- Platelet-derived growth factor
