= Dabigatran =

Anticoagulant medication, sold as Pradaxa and other brands

Dabigatran etexilate

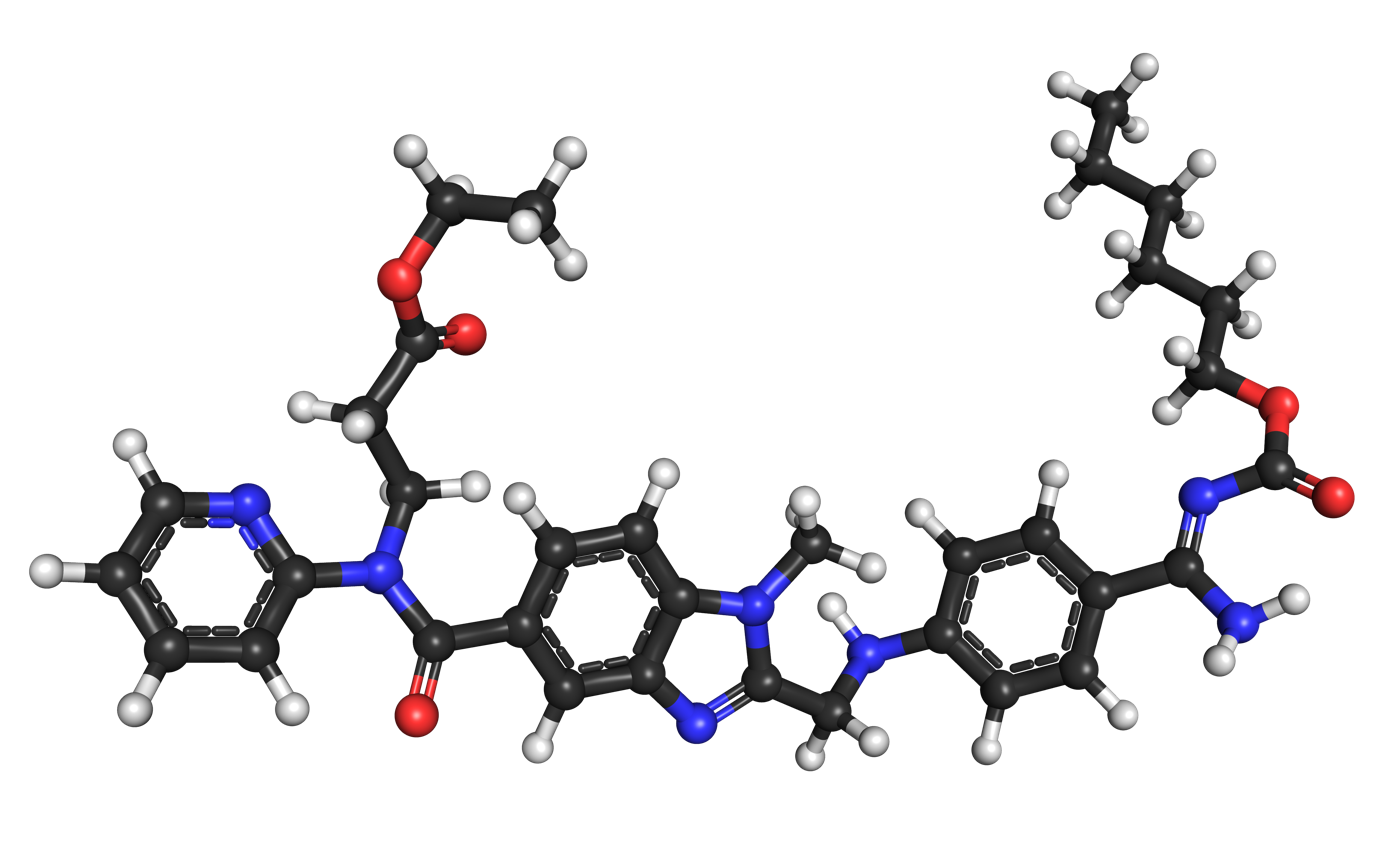
- Above: molecular structure of dabigatran etexilate Below: 3D representation of a dabigatran etexilate molecule

Clinical data
- Trade names: Pradaxa, Pradax, Prazaxa, others
- Other names: BIBR-953, BIBR-1048
- AHFS/Drugs.com: Monograph
- MedlinePlus: a610024
- License data: EU EMA: by INN; US DailyMed: Dabigatran
- Pregnancy category: AU: C
- Routes of administration: By mouth
- Drug class: Direct thrombin inhibitor
- ATC code: B01AE07 (WHO)

Legal status
- Legal status: AU: S4 (Prescription only); CA: ℞-only; UK: POM (Prescription only); US: ℞-only; EU: Rx-only

Pharmacokinetic data
- Bioavailability: 3–7%
- Protein binding: 35%
- Elimination half-life: 12–17 hours

Identifiers
- CAS Number: 211914-51-1; as etexilate: 211915-06-9
- PubChem CID: 216210; as etexilate: 135565674
- IUPHAR/BPS: 6380; as etexilate: 6379
- DrugBank: DB14726; as etexilate: DB06695
- ChemSpider: 187412; as etexilate: 4948999
- UNII: as etexilate: 2E18WX195X
- KEGG: D09707; as etexilate: D07144
- ChEBI: CHEBI:70752; as etexilate: CHEBI:70746
- ChEMBL: ChEMBL48361; as etexilate: ChEMBL539697
- PDB ligand: 4CC (PDBe, RCSB PDB)
- CompTox Dashboard (EPA): DTXSID50175419

Chemical and physical data
- Formula: C_{25}H_{25}N_{7}O_{3}
- Molar mass: 471.521 g·mol^{−1}
- 3D model (JSmol): Interactive image; as etexilate: Interactive image
- SMILES: CN1C=2C(=CC(C(N(CCC(O)=O)C3=CC=CC=N3)=O)=CC2)N=C1CNC4=CC=C(C(=N)N)C=C4; as etexilate: CN1C=2C(=CC(C(N(CCC(OCC)=O)C3=CC=CC=N3)=O)=CC2)N=C1CNC4=CC=C(C(NC(OCCCCCC)=O)=N)C=C4
- InChI: InChI=1S/C25H25N7O3/c1-31-20-10-7-17(25(35)32(13-11-23(33)34)21-4-2-3-12-28-21)14-19(20)30-22(31)15-29-18-8-5-16(6-9-18)24(26)27/h2-10,12,14,29H,11,13,15H2,1H3,(H3,26,27)(H,33,34); Key:YBSJFWOBGCMAKL-UHFFFAOYSA-N; as etexilate: InChI=1S/C34H41N7O5/c1-4-6-7-10-21-46-34(44)39-32(35)24-12-15-26(16-13-24)37-23-30-38-27-22-25(14-17-28(27)40(30)3)33(43)41(20-18-31(42)45-5-2)29-11-8-9-19-36-29/h8-9,11-17,19,22,37H,4-7,10,18,20-21,23H2,1-3H3,(H2,35,39,44); Key:KSGXQBZTULBEEQ-UHFFFAOYSA-N

Dabigatran, sold under the brand name Pradaxa among others, is an anticoagulant used to treat and prevent blood clots and to prevent stroke in people with atrial fibrillation. It is commonly used to prevent blood clots following hip or knee replacement and in those with a history of prior clots. and is used as an alternative to warfarin; it does not require monitoring by blood tests. In a meta-analysis of seven different studies, there was no benefit of dabigatran over warfarin in preventing ischemic stroke; however, dabigatran was associated with a lower hazard for intracranial bleeding compared with warfarin, but also had a higher risk of gastrointestinal bleeding. It is taken by mouth.

Common side effects include bleeding and gastritis. Other side effects may include bleeding around the spine and allergic reactions such as anaphylaxis. In cases of severe bleeding, it can be reversed with the antidote, idarucizumab. Use is not recommended during pregnancy or breastfeeding. Compared to warfarin it has fewer interactions with other medications. It is a direct thrombin inhibitor.

Dabigatran was approved for medical use in the US in 2010. It is on the World Health Organization's List of Essential Medicines. In 2020, it was the 306th most commonly prescribed medication in the United States, with more than 1 million prescriptions. Dabigatran is available a generic medication.

== Medical uses ==
Dabigatran is used to prevent strokes in those with atrial fibrillation not caused by heart valve issues, as well as deep vein thrombosis and pulmonary embolism in persons who have been treated for 5–10 days with parenteral anticoagulant (usually low molecular weight heparin), and to prevent deep vein thrombosis and pulmonary embolism in some circumstances.

It appears to be as effective as warfarin in preventing non-hemorrhagic strokes and embolic events in those with atrial fibrillation not due to valve problems.

In 2022, an observational meta-analysis study was performed on direct oral anticoagulants for patients with atrial fibrillation. The study found that dabigatran had comparable rates of ischemic stroke or systemic embolism, intracerebral haemorrhage, and all-cause mortality when compared to other anticoagulants like apixaban, edoxaban, and rivaroxaban. Notably, apixaban was associated with a lower risk of gastrointestinal bleeding than dabigatran and the others. This finding was generally steady for patients aged 80 years or older and those with chronic kidney disease.

== Contraindications ==
Dabigatran is contraindicated in patients who have active pathological bleeding, since dabigatran can increase bleeding risk and can also cause serious and potentially life-threatening bleeds. Dabigatran is also contraindicated in patients who have a history of serious hypersensitivity reaction to dabigatran (such as anaphylaxis or anaphylactic shock). The use of dabigatran should also be avoided in patients with mechanical prosthetic heart valves due to the increased risk of thromboembolic events (such as valve thrombosis, stroke or myocardial infarction) and major bleeding when compared with warfarin.

Current US Food and Drug Administration guidelines states that patients with mechanical heart valves should not be using dabigatran. The safety and efficacy of Pradaxa (dabigatran) were evaluated in the European RE-ALIGN trial in 2012. RE-ALIGN was terminated early because the Pradaxa treatment group had significantly more thromboembolic events and major bleeding than warfarin and determined to be contraindicated for use in patients with mechanical heart valves. Further studies are needed in order to determine effects of dabigatran on patients with bioprosthetic valves.

Dabigatran is poorly excreted in breastmilk and does not appear to require any limitations to breastfeeding. However, data is limited and further studies are needed.

== Adverse effects ==
The most commonly reported side effect of dabigatran is gastrointestinal upset. When compared with people anticoagulated with warfarin, patients taking dabigatran had fewer life-threatening bleeds, fewer minor and major bleeds, including intracranial bleeds, but the rate of gastrointestinal bleeding was significantly higher. Dabigatran capsules contain tartaric acid, which lowers the gastric pH and is required for adequate absorption. The lower pH has previously been associated with dyspepsia; some hypothesize that this plays a role in the increased risk of gastrointestinal bleeding. If a small amount of GI bleeding is diagnosed, the clinicians may consider adding H_{2} receptor inhibitor (H_{2}RA), proton pump inhibitors (PPIs) and mucosal protective agent. In severe bleeding, measures include discontinuation of dabigatran immediately, and administration of prothrombin complex concentrate, packed red blood cells, fresh frozen plasma, the use of specific reversal agents such as idarucizumab for dabigatran, and emergency endoscopic management.

A small but significantly increased risk of myocardial infarctions (heart attacks) has been noted when combining the safety outcome data from multiple trials. However, conflicting evidence from another review suggested that dabigatran might not substantially increase the risk of heart attacks, or if it does, then the associated risk is relatively low.

For patients with moderately reduced kidney function, lower dabigatran doses are recommended due to increased drug exposure and bleeding risk. Alternative anticoagulants should be considered in severe kidney impairment due to insufficient safety and efficacy data.

Dabigatran intake has also been reported to cause esophageal injury or esophagitis. In a 2016 study by Toya et al., roughly 20% of patients suffered esophageal mucosa damage. It has been theorized that the tartaric-acid core in the drug adheres and damages the esophagus, and then the damaged esophageal mucosa exfoliates after peristalsis. Additionally, patients with limited mobility, reduced salivary secretion, and low water consumption will increase the possibility of contact by dabigatran with the esophageal mucosa.

The Randomized Evaluation of Long-Term Anticoagulation Therapy (RE-LY) trial showed that impairment of liver function caused by dabigatran occurred in the same frequency as warfarin.

== Pharmacology ==
=== Mechanism of action ===
Dabigatran reversibly binds to the active site on the thrombin molecule, preventing thrombin-mediated activation of coagulation factors. Furthermore, dabigatran can inactivate thrombin even when thrombin is fibrin-bound; it reduces thrombin-mediated inhibition of fibrinolysis and, therefore, may enhance fibrinolysis.

=== Pharmacokinetics ===
Dabigatran has a half-life of approximately 12–17 hours and exerts a maximum anticoagulation effect within 2 hours after ingestion. Fatty foods delay the intestinal absorption of dabigatran, although the bioavailability of the drug is unaffected. Several studies have demonstrated that dabigatran plasma concentrations are reduced when co-administered with proton pump inhibitors, however it is unclear if this reduction is clinically significant. Dabigatran excretion through P-glycoprotein pumps is slowed in patients taking strong p-glycoprotein pump inhibitors such as quinidine, verapamil, and amiodarone, thus raising plasma levels of dabigatran.

Dabigatran is available as dabigatran etexilate mesilate, formulated as the prodrug dabigatran etexilate.

== History ==
Dabigatran (then compound BIBR-953) was discovered from a panel of chemicals with similar structure to benzamidine-based thrombin inhibitor α-NAPAP (N-alpha-(2-naphthylsulfonylglycyl)-4-amidinophenylalanine piperidide), which had been known since the 1980s as a powerful inhibitor of various serine proteases, specifically thrombin, but also trypsin. Addition of ethyl ester and hexyloxycarbonyl carbamide hydrophobic side chains led to the orally absorbed prodrug, BIBR 1048 (dabigatran etexilate).

In March 2008, the European Medicines Agency (EMA) granted marketing authorization for Pradaxa for the prevention of thromboembolic disease following hip or knee replacement surgery and for non-valvular atrial fibrillation.

The National Health Service (NHS) in Britain authorized dabigatran for use in preventing blood clots in hip and knee replacement surgery patients. According to a BBC article in 2008, Dabigatran was expected to cost the NHS £4.20 per day, which was similar to several other anticoagulants.

Initially, there was no specific way to reverse the anticoagulant effect of dabigatran in the event of a major bleeding event, unlike for warfarin. Since then, the dabigatran-specific antidote idarucizumab, a humanized monoclonal antibody for intravenous administration, was developed, and received Food and Drug Administration (FDA) approval in 2015.

Pradaxa received a Notice of Compliance (NOC) from Health Canada in June 2008, for the prevention of blood clots in patients who have undergone total hip or total knee replacement surgery. Approval for atrial fibrillation patients at risk of stroke came in October 2010.

The U.S. Food and Drug Administration (FDA) approved Pradaxa in October 2010, for prevention of stroke in patients with non-valvular atrial fibrillation. The approval came after an advisory committee recommended the drug for approval in September 2010, although caution is still urged by some outside experts.

In February 2011, the American College of Cardiology Foundation and the American Heart Association added dabigatran to their guidelines for management of non-valvular atrial fibrillation with a class I recommendation.

In May 2014, the FDA reported the results of a large study comparing dabigatran with warfarin in 134,000 Medicare patients. The agency concluded that dabigatran is associated with a lower risk of overall mortality, ischemic stroke, and bleeding in the brain than warfarin. Gastrointestinal bleeding was more common in those treated with dabigatran than in those treated with warfarin. The risk of heart attack was similar between the two drugs. The FDA reiterated its opinion that dabigatran's overall risk/benefit ratio is favorable.

In July 2014, a series of investigations accused the privately held Boehringer Ingelheim pharmaceutical group of withholding critical information about the need for monitoring to protect patients from severe bleeding, particularly in the elderly. Review of internal communications between Boehringer researchers and employees by the FDA and the EMA revealed that Boehringer researchers had found evidence that serum levels of dabigatran vary widely. The BMJ investigation suggested that Boehringer had a financial motive to withhold this concern from regulatory health agencies because the data conflicted with their extensive marketing of dabigatran as an anticoagulant that does not require monitoring. In August 2012, Pradaxa claims filed in U.S. federal courts were consolidated into a multi-district litigation in the Southern District of Illinois before Chief Judge David R. Herndon. In May 2014, a $650 million settlement was announced on behalf of approximately 3,900 claimants who were injured by the drug Pradaxa made by Boehringer Ingelheim Pharmaceuticals, Inc. The drug was alleged to cause severe bleeding events and/or hemorrhaging to those who were taking the drug.
