= Benzamidine =

- Skeletal formula

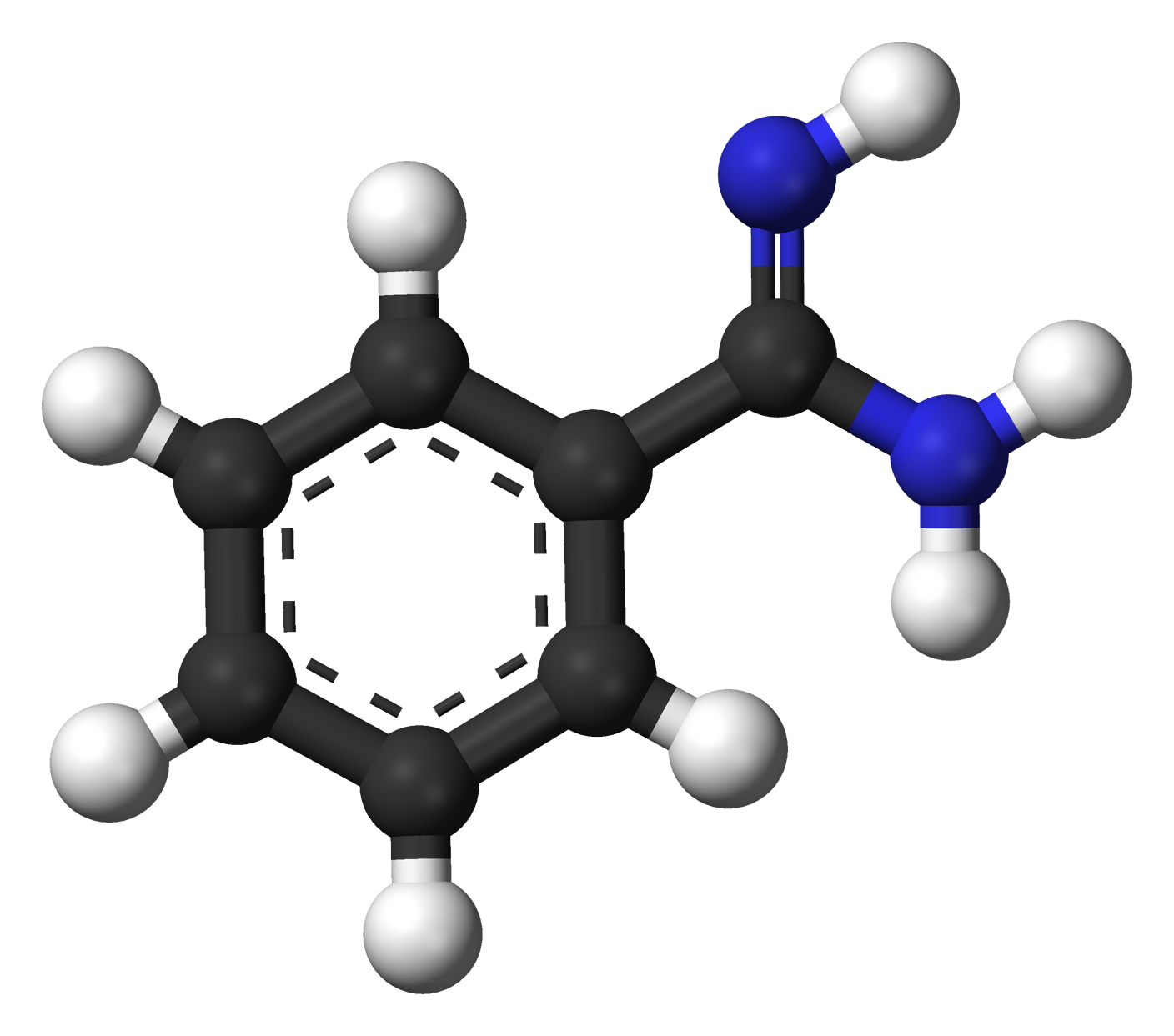
- Ball-and-stick model

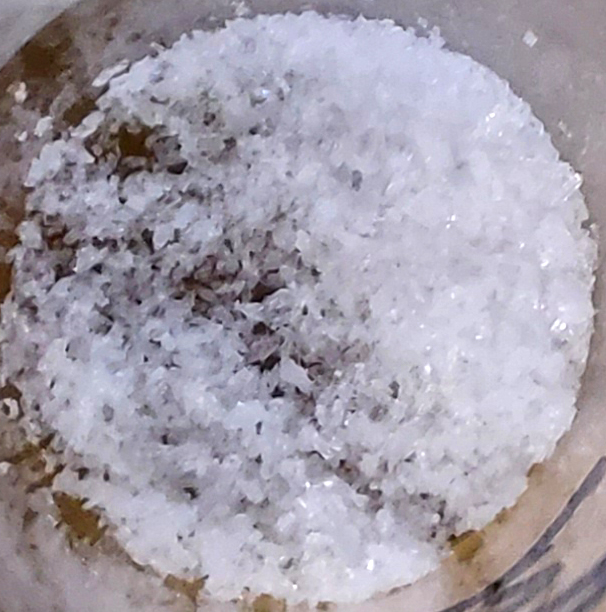

Names
- Preferred IUPAC name Benzenecarboximidamide

Identifiers
CAS Number	618-39-3
3D model (JSmol)	Interactive image
ChEBI	CHEBI:41033
ChEMBL	ChEMBL20936
ChemSpider	2242
ECHA InfoCard	100.009.589
IUPHAR/BPS	7566
KEGG	C01784
PubChem CID	2332
UNII	KUE3ZY3J1F
CompTox Dashboard (EPA)	DTXSID8045012
- InChI: InChI=1S/C7H8N2/c8-7(9)6-4-2-1-3-5-6/h1-5H,(H3,8,9) Key: PXXJHWLDUBFPOL-UHFFFAOYSA-N; InChI=1/C7H8N2/c8-7(9)6-4-2-1-3-5-6/h1-5H,(H3,8,9) Key: PXXJHWLDUBFPOL-UHFFFAOYAU
- SMILES: [NH]=C(N)c1ccccc1

Properties
Chemical formula	C_{7}H_{8}N_{2}
Molar mass	120.155 g·mol^{−1}
Appearance	White solid
Density	1.22 g/cm^{3}
Melting point	64–66 °C (147–151 °F; 337–339 K)
- Except where otherwise noted, data are given for materials in their standard state (at 25 °C [77 °F], 100 kPa). verify (what is ?) Infobox references

Benzamidine is an organic compound with the formula C_{6}H_{5}C(NH)NH_{2}. It is the simplest aryl amidine. The compound is a white solid that is slightly soluble in water. It is usually handled as the hydrochloride salt, a white, water-soluble solid.

== Structure ==
Benzamidine has one short C=NH bond and one longer C-NH_{2} bond, which are respectively 129 and 135 pm in length, respectively.

The triangular diamine group gives it a distinctive shape which shows up in difference density maps.

== Applications ==
Benzamidine is a reversible competitive inhibitor of trypsin, trypsin-like enzymes, and serine proteases.

It is often used as a ligand in protein crystallography to prevent proteases from degrading a protein of interest. The benzamidine moiety is also found in some pharmaceuticals, such as dabigatran.

Condensation with various haloketones provides a synthetic route to 2,4-disubstituted imidazoles.

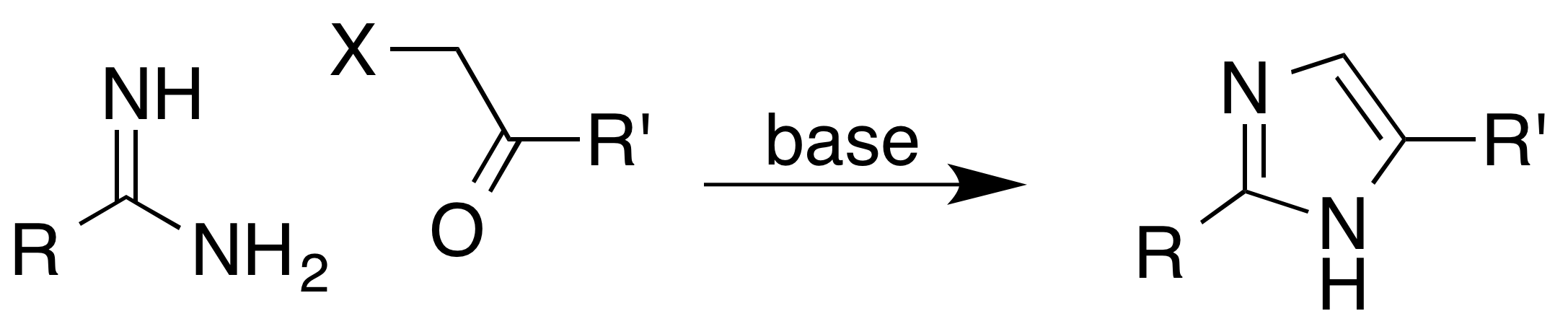
