= Lepirudin =

Pharmaceutical drug

Clinical data
- Trade names: Refludan
- AHFS/Drugs.com: Monograph
- Routes of administration: SQ or IV
- ATC code: B01AE02 (WHO)

Legal status
- Legal status: US: ℞-only

Pharmacokinetic data
- Bioavailability: 100
- Elimination half-life: ~1.3 hours
- Excretion: Renal

Identifiers
- IUPAC name: [Leu^{1},Thr^{2}]-63-desulfohirudin
- CAS Number: 138068-37-8
- IUPHAR/BPS: 6469
- DrugBank: DB00001
- ChemSpider: none
- UNII: Y43GF64R34
- KEGG: D03692
- ChEBI: CHEBI:142437
- ChEMBL: ChEMBL1201666
- CompTox Dashboard (EPA): DTXSID50160461

Chemical and physical data
- Formula: C_{287}H_{440}N_{80}O_{111}S_{6}
- Molar mass: 6979.49 g·mol^{−1}
- SMILES: CC[C@H](C)[C@@H]1NC(=O)[C@@H]2CSSC[C@H](NC(=O)[C@H](CC(C)C)NC(=O)[C@@H]3CSSC[C@H](NC(=O)[C@H](CC(=O)O)NC(=O)[C@@H](NC(=O)[C@H](Cc4ccc(O)cc4)NC(=O)[C@@H](NC(=O)[C@@H](N)CC(C)C)[C@@H](C)O)[C@@H](C)O)C(=O)N[C@@H]([C@@H](C)O)C(=O)N[C@@H](CCC(=O)O)C(=O)N[C@@H](CO)C(=O)NCC(=O)N[C@@H](CCC(N)=O)C(=O)N[C@@H](CC(N)=O)C(=O)N[C@@H](CC(C)C)C(=O)N3)C(=O)N[C@@H](CCC(=O)O)C(=O)NCC(=O)N[C@@H](CO)C(=O)N[C@@H](CC(N)=O)C(=O)N[C@@H](C(C)C)C(=O)N[C@@H](CSSC[C@@H](C(=O)N[C@H](C(=O)N[C@H](C(=O)NCC(=O)N[C@@H](CCC(=O)O)C(=O)NCC(=O)N[C@H](C(=O)N3CCC[C@H]3C(=O)N[C@@H](CCCCN)C(=O)N3CCC[C@H]3C(=O)N[C@@H](CCC(N)=O)C(=O)N[C@@H](CO)C(=O)N[C@@H](Cc3c[nH]cn3)C(=O)N[C@@H](CC(N)=O)C(=O)N[C@@H](CC(=O)O)C(=O)NCC(=O)N[C@@H](CC(=O)O)C(=O)N[C@@H](Cc3ccccc3)C(=O)N[C@@H](CCC(=O)O)C(=O)N[C@@H](CCC(=O)O)C(=O)N[C@H](C(=O)N3CCC[C@H]3C(=O)N[C@@H](CCC(=O)O)C(=O)N[C@@H](CCC(=O)O)C(=O)N[C@@H](Cc3ccc(O)cc3)C(=O)N[C@@H](CC(C)C)C(=O)N[C@@H](CCC(N)=O)C(=O)O)[C@@H](C)CC)[C@@H](C)O)[C@@H](C)O)C(C)C)NC(=O)[C@H](CCC(N)=O)NC(=O)[C@H](CC(N)=O)NC(=O)[C@H](CCCCN)NC(=O)[C@H](CCC(=O)O)NC(=O)CNC(=O)[C@H](CC(=O)O)NC(=O)[C@H](CO)NC(=O)CNC(=O)[C@H](CC(C)C)NC1=O)C(=O)NCC(=O)N[C@@H](CCC(N)=O)C(=O)NCC(=O)N[C@@H](CC(N)=O)C(=O)N[C@@H](CCCCN)C(=O)N2
- InChI: InChI=1S/C287H440N80O111S6/c1-24-132(17)225-280(470)345-162(87-126(5)6)236(426)306-111-209(396)320-181(116-370)267(457)344-176(101-220(416)417)238(428)307-105-203(390)316-152(61-74-213(402)403)243(433)321-146(40-29-32-80-288)241(431)339-171(96-198(298)385)259(449)326-153(56-69-194(294)381)250(440)351-186(121-482-479-118-183-240(430)310-107-202(389)313-148(54-67-192(292)379)233(423)303-108-206(393)317-170(95-197(297)384)258(448)322-147(41-30-33-81-289)242(432)350-187(272(462)359-225)122-483-480-119-184(269(459)323-150(60-73-212(400)401)235(425)304-110-208(395)319-180(115-369)266(456)342-174(99-201(301)388)265(455)357-223(130(13)14)278(468)355-183)352-254(444)165(90-129(11)12)335-270(460)185-120-481-484-123-188(354-263(453)178(103-222(420)421)347-283(473)230(137(22)375)362-264(454)168(93-141-48-52-144(378)53-49-141)346-282(472)228(135(20)373)361-232(422)145(291)86-125(3)4)273(463)363-229(136(21)374)281(471)330-158(65-78-217(410)411)249(439)348-179(114-368)239(429)309-106-204(391)315-151(55-68-193(293)380)244(434)340-172(97-199(299)386)260(450)334-164(89-128(9)10)253(443)353-185)271(461)358-224(131(15)16)279(469)364-227(134(19)372)277(467)311-112-205(392)314-149(59-72-211(398)399)234(424)305-113-210(397)356-231(138(23)376)286(476)367-85-37-45-191(367)276(466)331-160(42-31-34-82-290)284(474)365-83-35-43-189(365)274(464)328-154(57-70-195(295)382)248(438)349-182(117-371)268(458)338-169(94-142-104-302-124-312-142)257(447)341-173(98-200(300)387)261(451)343-175(100-219(414)415)237(427)308-109-207(394)318-177(102-221(418)419)262(452)337-166(91-139-38-27-26-28-39-139)255(445)327-155(62-75-214(404)405)245(435)325-159(66-79-218(412)413)251(441)360-226(133(18)25-2)285(475)366-84-36-44-190(366)275(465)329-157(64-77-216(408)409)246(436)324-156(63-76-215(406)407)247(437)336-167(92-140-46-50-143(377)51-47-140)256(446)333-163(88-127(7)8)252(442)332-161(287(477)478)58-71-196(296)383/h26-28,38-39,46-53,104,124-138,145-191,223-231,368-378H,24-25,29-37,40-45,54-103,105-123,288-291H2,1-23H3,(H2,292,379)(H2,293,380)(H2,294,381)(H2,295,382)(H2,296,383)(H2,297,384)(H2,298,385)(H2,299,386)(H2,300,387)(H2,301,388)(H,302,312)(H,303,423)(H,304,425)(H,305,424)(H,306,426)(H,307,428)(H,308,427)(H,309,429)(H,310,430)(H,311,467)(H,313,389)(H,314,392)(H,315,391)(H,316,390)(H,317,393)(H,318,394)(H,319,395)(H,320,396)(H,321,433)(H,322,448)(H,323,459)(H,324,436)(H,325,435)(H,326,449)(H,327,445)(H,328,464)(H,329,465)(H,330,471)(H,331,466)(H,332,442)(H,333,446)(H,334,450)(H,335,460)(H,336,437)(H,337,452)(H,338,458)(H,339,431)(H,340,434)(H,341,447)(H,342,456)(H,343,451)(H,344,457)(H,345,470)(H,346,472)(H,347,473)(H,348,439)(H,349,438)(H,350,432)(H,351,440)(H,352,444)(H,353,443)(H,354,453)(H,355,468)(H,356,397)(H,357,455)(H,358,461)(H,359,462)(H,360,441)(H,361,422)(H,362,454)(H,363,463)(H,364,469)(H,398,399)(H,400,401)(H,402,403)(H,404,405)(H,406,407)(H,408,409)(H,410,411)(H,412,413)(H,414,415)(H,416,417)(H,418,419)(H,420,421)(H,477,478)/t132-,133-,134+,135+,136+,137+,138+,145-,146-,147-,148-,149-,150-,151-,152-,153-,154-,155-,156-,157-,158-,159-,160-,161-,162-,163-,164-,165-,166-,167-,168-,169-,170-,171-,172-,173-,174-,175-,176-,177-,178-,179-,180-,181-,182-,183-,184-,185-,186-,187-,188-,189-,190-,191-,223-,224-,225-,226-,227-,228-,229-,230-,231-/m0/s1; Key:FIBJDTSHOUXTKV-BRHMIFOHSA-N

Lepirudin is an anticoagulant that functions as a direct thrombin inhibitor.

Brand name: Refludan, Generic: Lepirudin rDNA for injection.

Lepirudin is a recombinant hirudin derived from yeast cells. Lepirudin is almost identical to hirudin extracted from Hirudo medicinalis, having the amino acid sequence LTYTDCTESGQNLCLCEGSNVCGQGNKCILGSDGEKNQCVTGEGTPKPQSHNDGDFEEIPEEYLQ with disulfide bridges at Cys6-Cys14, Cys16-Cys28 and Cys22-Cys39, and differs from by the substitution of leucine for isoleucine at the N-terminal end of the molecule and the absence of a sulfate group on the tyrosine at position 63.

Lepirudin may be used as an anticoagulant when heparins (unfractionated or low-molecular-weight) are contraindicated because of heparin-induced thrombocytopenia.

== Market withdrawal ==
Bayer announced that it ceased the production of lepirudin (Refludan) on May 31, 2012. At the time of the announcement, the company expected that supply from wholesalers was going to be depleted by mid-2013.
