= Venombin A =

Identifiers
- EC no.: 3.4.21.74
- CAS no.: 146240-35-9

Databases
- IntEnz: IntEnz view
- BRENDA: BRENDA entry
- ExPASy: NiceZyme view
- KEGG: KEGG entry
- MetaCyc: metabolic pathway
- PRIAM: profile
- PDB structures: RCSB PDB PDBe PDBsum
Search
- PMC: articles
- PubMed: articles
- NCBI: proteins

Venombin A (EC 3.4.21.74, alpha-fibrinogenase, habutobin, zinc metalloproteinase Cbfib1.1, zinc metalloproteinase Cbfib1.2, zinc metalloproteinase Cbfib2, ancrod) is an enzyme. This enzyme catalyses the following chemical reaction

Selective cleavage of Arg- bond in fibrinogen, to form fibrin, and release fibrinopeptide A. The specificity of further degradation of fibrinogen varies with species origin of the enzyme

This enzyme is a thrombin-like enzyme from venoms of snakes of the viper/rattlesnake group. Examples include ancrod and batroxobin, two serine proteases from snakes that have been used in medical preparations.

== Applications ==
Venombin A enzymes are the sole representatives of the defibrinogenating agent class of drugs, which by its protease action removes fibrinogen from the circulation. They are thought to act as an antithrombotic by depletion of fibrinogen. They are different from thrombin in that they only cleave fibrinogen alpha chain (those do cleave both chains are called venombin AB), which will end up only producing weak, urea-soluble microthrombi that is easily removed by plasmin. Their benefit in acute ischaemic stroke is not supported by available evidence.

Alternatively, batroxobin is also used as a topical hemostatic by its rapid local clot-expansion action.
