= CCDC187 =

Protein found in humans

Identifiers
- Aliases: CCDC187, coiled-coil domain containing 187
- External IDs: MGI: 3045295; GeneCards: CCDC187

Gene location (Human)
| Chr. | Chromosome 9 (human) |
| Band | 9q34.3 | Start | 136,249,973 bp |
| Band | 9q34.3 | End | 136,306,901 bp |

Gene location (Mouse)
| Chr. | Chromosome 2 (mouse) |
| Band | 2|2 A3 | Start | 26,133,481 bp |
| Band | 2|2 A3 | End | 26,184,569 bp |
RNA expression pattern
| Bgee | Human / Mouse (ortholog); Top expressed in: right uterine tube; sperm; right testis; left testis; tendon of biceps brachii; olfactory zone of nasal mucosa; pituitary gland; right lobe of thyroid gland; left lobe of thyroid gland; anterior pituitary / Top expressed in: seminiferous tubule; lumbar subsegment of spinal cord; spermatid; esophagus; lateral ventricle; choroid plexus of lateral ventricle; respiratory epithelium; olfactory system; nasal epithelium; olfactory epithelium; More reference expression data |
| BioGPS | n/a |
Gene ontology
| Molecular function | microtubule binding |
| Cellular component | centrosome |
| Biological process | microtubule anchoring |
Sources:Amigo / QuickGO
Orthologs
| Databases | NCBI: entry; OMA: entry |
| Species | Human | Mouse |
| Entrez | 399693 | 329366 |
| Ensembl | ENSG00000260220 | ENSMUSG00000048038 |
| UniProt | A0A096LP49 | Q8C5V8 |
| RefSeq (mRNA) | NM_001291516; NM_001378118; NM_001378188 | NM_177841 |
| RefSeq (protein) | NP_001278445; NP_001365117 | NP_808509 |
| Location (UCSC) | Chr 9: 136.25 – 136.31 Mb | Chr 2: 26.13 – 26.18 Mb |
| PubMed search |
- Wikidata
| View/Edit Human | View/Edit Mouse |

Coiled-coil domain-containing protein 187, previously called MGC50722, is a protein that in humans is encoded by the gene CCDC187. The 965 amino acid human protein has a molecular weight of 104.495 kDa and one domain of unknown function (DUF390). Generally conserved across mammals, this quickly evolving gene shows relatively low expression in most human tissues except in the testis.

== Gene ==
The entire human gene is 40,364 base pairs in length, while the unprocessed mRNA is 25,960 base pairs long. After splicing of introns the 10 exon gene has a final mRNA length of 3,596 base pairs that encodes for 965 amino acids.

=== Locus ===
Human MGC50722 is located on the minus strand of chromosome 9 in the region q34 of the human genome (NCBI Gene ID: 399693). The most characterized gene in this region of the human genome is GPSM1, which encodes the G-protein-signaling modulator 1 protein.

== Homology and evolution ==
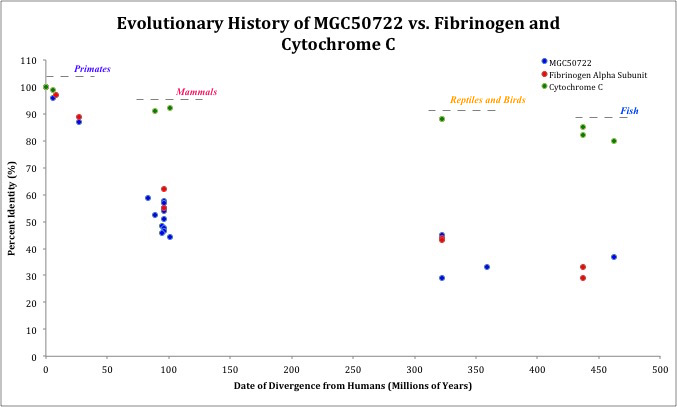
Divergence of the human MGC50722 gene graphed against Fibrinogen and Cytochrome C divergence. Each data point on the graph represents a different species and that species homologous gene as identified through BLAST. BLAST searches were conducted using the human MGC50722, Fibrinogen and Cytochrome C gene and the percent identities were graphed against the actual divergence from humans for that species homologous gene.

=== Paralogs ===
It was found that the centrosome-associated protein 350 (CEP350) was the only possible paralog to protein MGC50722 in humans. CEP350 is a 3117 amino acid long protein and aligns with protein MGC50722 at its N-terminus. This indicates the paralog spacing is very distant for when MGC50722 split from CEP350.

=== Orthologs ===
Compete orthologs for protein MGC50722 are found only in mammals, where most conservation is found within the N-terminus and DUF390.

=== Distant homologs ===
The most distant homolog detectable is in cartilaginous fish (462.5 MYA).

=== Homologous domains ===
The domain of unknown function 390 (pfam04094: DUF390) is part of a family of proteins that have only been identified within the rice genome. Although this domain's function is unknown, it may be some kind of transposable element.

== Protein ==
=== Primary sequence and isoforms ===
Human protein MGC50722 is 104.495 kDa, with an isoelectric point of 10.24. A mixed charged cluster of amino acids is present between positions 146 and 182, which seems to be conserved in primates, but not present in other mammals. There are also 6 predicted isoforms found in human.

=== Subcellualar localization signals ===
PSORTII servers predict 5 nuclear localization signals in the human protein MGC50722. When ortholog sequences to the human protein were run through PSORT II, the predicted nuclear subcellular localization was a consensus prediction.

Predicted nuclear localization signals in human protein MGC50722
| Signal Type | Residue Span | Amino Acid Sequence |
|---|---|---|
| pat4 | 46-49 | RPRK |
| pat4 | 148-151 | KPKR |
| pat7 | 43-49 | PQQRPRK |
| pat7 | 149-155 | PKRVKSS |
| pat7 | 302-308 | PSKRRLQ |

=== Post-translational modifications ===
Human protein MGC50722 ortholog in mice, 4932418E24Rik protein, has experimentally determined phosphorylation sites at S588, S591, and S670 in the testis (pTestis ID: PT-MM-02686). Prediction servers at ExPASy also predict more phosphorylation sites (NetPhos 2.0 Server), a N-terminal acetylation site (NetAcet 1.0 Server), glycation sites (NetGlycate 1.0 Server), and a GalNAc O-glycosylation site (NetOGlyc 4.0 Server) at conserved residues in the human MGC50722 protein.

=== Secondary structure ===
Prediction models characterized protein MGC50722 as mostly disordered, but two regions of coiled-coils.

=== Protein internal structure and features ===
| Feature | Residue Span |
|---|---|
| Region of Low Complexity | 11-26 |
| DUF390 | 405-690 |
| Region of Low Complexity | 410-423 |
| Region of Low Complexity | 546-556 |
| Coiled-Coil | 546-566 |
| Region of Low Complexity | 606-621 |
| Coiled-Coil | 720-753 |
| Region of Low Complexity | 771-791 |
| Region of Low Complexity | 871-884 |

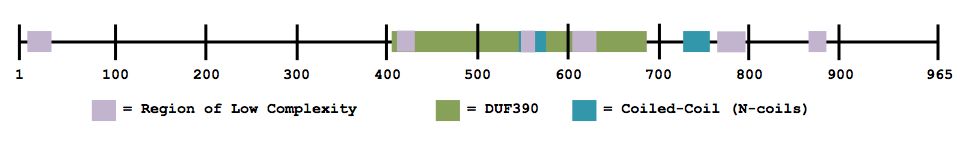
Protein MGC50722 primary amino acid sequence and its internal features/structures.

== Potential function ==
The function of protein MGC50722 is unknown. Given that it is preferentially expressed in the testis and appears to be subcellularly localized in the nucleus, it could play an important role in gamete cells.

== Interacting proteins ==
Due to the recent identification of this gene and its protein, interaction databases (MINT, STRING, IntAct, and BioGRID) have not identified any interactions. More data would expand the characterization of MGC50722.

== Expression ==
Expression levels of human MGC50722 appear to low/absent in most cell types, with the highest and most abundant expression shown to be in the testis (GEO Profile IDs: 48997768 and 49895282). A lung cancer study also showed that MGC50722 was expressed in CD4+ T-Cells of normal human tissue samples.

=== Promoter ===
The transcriptional start site for MGC50722 aligns best with SPZ1, SORY, SP1F, and FAST transcription factor binding sites.

== Clinical significance ==
A significant GEO Profile relating to MGC50722 was a study done on male fertility in humans looking at the disease teratozoospermia (GEO Profile ID: 38113951). Teratozoospermia is a condition where during the development of mature sperm cells morphology is altered, thus leading to, in some cases, male infertility. Gene expression shows that in normal human subjects MGC50722 is expressed, while in subjects with teratozoospermia expression levels drop significantly or shut off.

== Suggested reading ==
- Wagner F, French L, Veh RW (Sep 2014). "Transcriptomic-anatomic analysis of the mouse habenula uncovers a high molecular heterogeneity among neurons in the lateral complex, while gene expression in the medial complex largely obeys subnuclear boundaries". Brain Structure & Function. 221 (1): 39–58. doi:10.1007/s00429-014-0891-9. PMID 25244943. S2CID 18004946.
- Foong RE, Bosco A, Jones AC, Gout A, Gorman S, Hart PH, Zosky GR (Apr 2015). "In utero Vitamin D Deficiency Increases Airway Smooth Muscle Mass and Impairs Lung Function". American Journal of Respiratory Cell and Molecular Biology. 53 (5): 664–75. doi:10.1165/rcmb.2014-0356OC. PMID 25867172.
- Dobrin, Radu, et al. (2009). "Multi-tissue coexpression networks reveal unexpected subnetworks associated with disease". Genome Biology. 10 (5): R55. doi:10.1186/gb-2009-10-5-r55. PMC 2718521. PMID 19463160.
- Ediger, BN, Du, A, Liu, J, Hunter, CS, Walp, ER, Schug, J, May, CL (Dec 2014). "Islet-1 Is essential for pancreatic β-cell function". Diabetes. 63 (12): 4206–17. doi:10.2337/db14-0096. PMC 4237994. PMID 25028525.
- Vamathevan, JJ (Jan 2009). Evolutionary analysis of mammalian genomes and associations to human disease (Thesis). University College London.
