= FGL1 =

Protein-coding gene in the species Homo sapiens

Identifiers
- Aliases: FGL1, HFREP1, HP-041, LFIRE-1, LFIRE1, fibrinogen like 1, HPS
- External IDs: OMIM: 605776; MGI: 102795; GeneCards: FGL1

Gene location (Human)
Chr.	Chromosome 8 (human)
Band	8p22	Start	17,864,380 bp
Band	8p22	End	17,910,365 bp

Gene location (Mouse)
Chr.	Chromosome 8 (mouse)
Band	8|8 A4	Start	41,644,471 bp
Band	8|8 A4	End	41,668,193 bp
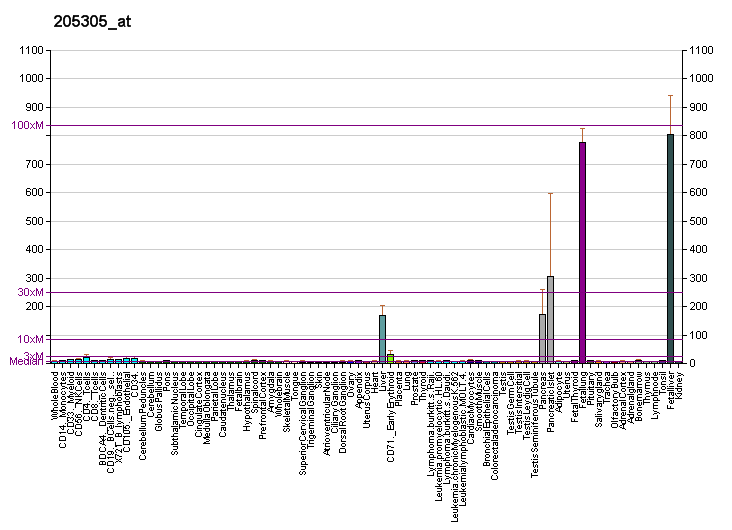
RNA expression pattern
Bgee	Human / Mouse (ortholog); Top expressed in: right lobe of liver; body of pancreas; sperm; islet of Langerhans; buccal mucosa cell; testicle; pancreatic epithelial cell; endometrium; placenta; left testis / Top expressed in: left lobe of liver; sexually immature organism; motor neuron; primary oocyte; right kidney; proximal tubule; secondary oocyte; primitive streak; Paneth cell; supraoptic nucleus; More reference expression data
BioGPS	More reference expression data
Orthologs
Databases	NCBI: entry; OMA: entry
Species	Human	Mouse
Entrez	2267	234199
Ensembl	ENSG00000104760	ENSMUSG00000031594
UniProt	Q08830	Q71KU9
RefSeq (mRNA)	NM_201553; NM_004467; NM_147203; NM_201552	NM_145594
RefSeq (protein)	NP_004458; NP_671736; NP_963846; NP_963847	NP_663569
Location (UCSC)	Chr 8: 17.86 – 17.91 Mb	Chr 8: 41.64 – 41.67 Mb
PubMed search
- Wikidata
View/Edit Human	View/Edit Mouse

Fibrinogen-like protein 1 (FGL-1) is a protein that is structurally related to fibrinogen. In humans, FGL-1 is encoded by the FGL1 gene. It is classified as a hepatokine. Four splice variants exist for this gene.

== Function ==
Fibrinogen-like protein 1 is a member of the fibrinogen family of proteins, which also includes fibrinogen, fibrinogen-like protein 2, and clotting factors V, VIII, and XIII. FGL-1 is homologous to the carboxy terminus of the fibrinogen beta- and gamma- subunits which contains the four conserved cysteines of that are common to all members of the fibrinogen family. However, FGL-1 lacks the platelet-binding site, cross-linking region, and thrombin-sensitive site which allow the other members of the fibrinogen family to aid in fibrin clot formation.

FGL-1 has also been observed to strongly bind to and activate LAG-3, a regulatory protein expressed on T cells. As LAG-3 has an important role in controlling activated T cells, manipulating FGL-1 binding to T cells has been proposed for both cancer immunotherapy and anti-inflammatory treatments.

== Clinical significance ==
FGL-1 may play a role in the development of hepatocellular carcinomas.
