= Batroxobin =

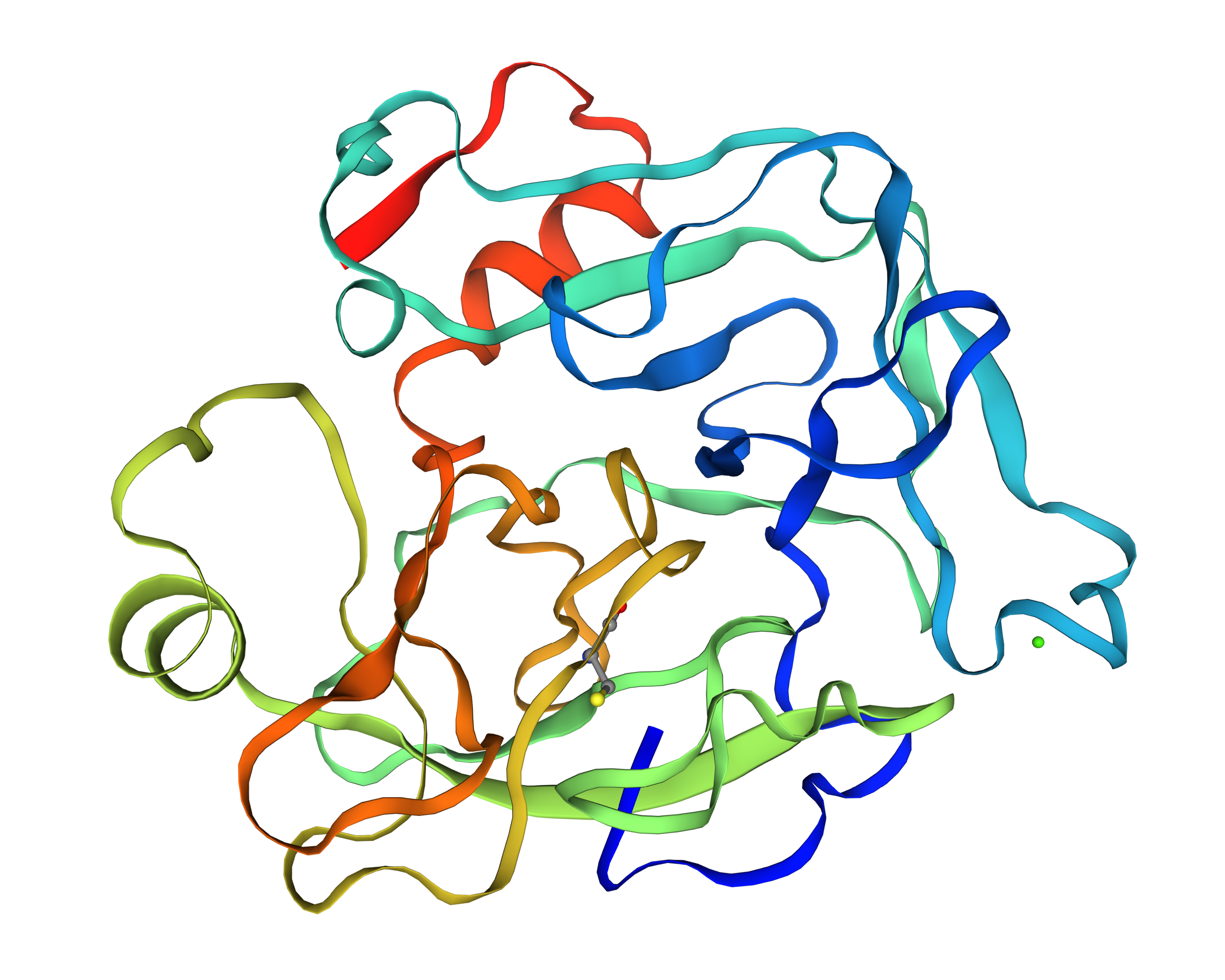

Clinical data
- AHFS/Drugs.com: International Drug Names
- ATC code: B02BX03 (WHO)

Identifiers
- CAS Number: 9039-61-6
- ChemSpider: none
- UNII: 47RYF40GA9
- ECHA InfoCard: 100.029.914

Thrombin-like enzyme batroxobin

Identifiers
- Organism: Bothrops atrox
- Symbol: ?
- UniProt: P04971
Search for
- Structures: Swiss-model
- Domains: InterPro

Batroxobin, also known as reptilase, is a snake venom enzyme with Venombin A activity produced by Bothrops atrox and Bothrops moojeni, venomous species of pit viper found east of the Andes in South America. It is a hemotoxin which acts as a serine protease similarly to thrombin, and has been the subject of many medical studies as a replacement of thrombin. Different enzymes, isolated from different species of Bothrops, have been called batroxobin, but unless stated otherwise, this article covers the batroxobin produced by B. moojeni, as this is the most studied variety.

== History ==
Bothrops atrox was described by Carl Linnaeus as early as 1758, but batroxobin, the active compound in its venom, was first described only in 1954 by H. Bruck and G. Salem. In the years following, this first description of batroxobin was shown to have several uses in surgery. Because of the increasing interest in the properties of batroxobin, several studies on its hemostatic effect and coagulation have been published. More recently, in 1979, a German study showed the uses of batroxobin (reptilase clot retraction test) as a replacement test for the more commonly used thrombin time. Because the enzyme is unaffected by heparin, it is mostly used when heparin is present in blood. Recent studies emphasize more on improving its uses in surgery, mostly spinal surgery, and the uses as serine protease.

== Available forms ==
Batroxobin is a protein of the serine protease family. Batroxobin is closely related in physiological function and molecular size to thrombin. Five subspecies for the Brazilian lancehead snake (Bothrops atrox) are found. Batroxobin obtained from certain subspecies exhibits the hemostatic efficacy, whereas the protein obtained from other subspecies exhibits the cleavage of fibrinogen. Some of the forms have hemostatic efficacy as main effect, where the other forms have degradation of fibrinogen as main effect. Batroxobin that is naturally extracted from the snake venom is mainly obtained from the snake Bothrops moojeni. But the concentration is low and it is difficult to purify the protein. Often the product remains polluted, this makes it harder to use for clinical purposes. Theoretically, the molecular weight of batroxobin should be around 25.5 kDa. Often, isolated batroxobin is heavier, around 33 kDa. The higher molecular weight is caused by a glycosylation modification during the secretion. The differences in weight result from different possible purification procedures, which can remove different sugar(chains) from the enzyme. Because the batroxobin isolated from venom is highly irregular in quality, it is now more often synthesized in organisms using Bothrops moojeni cDNA.

== Structure ==
The structure and working mechanism of batroxobin extracted from the Bothrops moojeni have been thoroughly studied. Various subspecies exist and the working mechanisms of each batroxobin differ. As such, the structure of Bothrops moojeni batroxobin is further elucidated. The structure of batroxobin has been studied by various research groups throughout the years. These studies have mostly been performed by biologically synthesizing batroxobin from Bothrops moojeni cDNA, and analyzing this product and using homology models based on other proteases, such as thrombin and trypsin, among others. One of the earlier studies from 1986 showed that the molecular weight is 25.503 kDa, 32.312 kDa with the carbohydrate, and it consists of 231 amino acids. The amino acid sequence exhibited significant homology with other known mammalian serine proteases, such as trypsin, thrombin, and most notably pancreatic kallikrein. It was therefore concluded that it is indeed a member of the serine protease family. Based on the homology, the disulfide bridges were identified and the structure was elucidated further. A later molecular modelling study from 1998 used the homology between glandular kallikrein from the mouse and batroxobin, which is about 40%, to propose a 3D structure for biologically active batroxobin. To date no definite 3D structure has been proposed.

== Biological synthesis in micro-organisms ==
After the cDNA nucleotide sequence of batroxobin from Bothrops moojeni was determined back in 1986, a research group from the Kyoto Sangyo university successfully expressed the cDNA for batroxobin in E. Coli in 1990 The recognition sequence for thrombin was used to obtain mature batroxobin. The fusion protein which was obtained was insoluble and was easily purified. After cleaving the fusion protein, the recombinant batroxobin could be isolated by electrophoresis and it was then successfully refolded to produce biologically active batroxobin. This study showed that it was possible to produce batroxobin using micro-organisms, a method which was more promising than isolating the enzyme from extracted snake venom. In 2004, a research group from Korea produced batroxobin by expressing it in the yeast species Pichia pastoris. This recombinant enzyme had a molecular weight of 33 kDa and included the carbohydrate structure. This method of expressing it in Pichia pastoris turned out to be more effective, as the produced enzyme showed cleaving activity which was more specific than thrombin in some cases and was more specific than non-recombinant batroxobin. Therefore, synthesis using Pichia pastoris seems promising for producing high quality recombinant batroxobin.

== Toxicodynamics and reactivity ==
=== Reactions and mechanism of action ===
As described earlier, batroxobin is an enzyme which has a serine protease activity on its substrate, fibrinogen. A serine protease cleaves a protein at the position of a serine, to degenerate a protein. Batroxobin is comparable to the enzyme thrombin, which is also a serine protease for fibrinogen. Fibrinogen is an important protein for hemostasis, because it plays a critical role in platelet aggregation and fibrin clot formation. Normally when one is wounded, thrombin cleaves the fibrinogen, which forms clots. As a result, the wound is ‘closed’ by these clots and recovery of the epithelial cells of the skin can take place. This is the natural process necessary for tissue repair. The venom batroxobin also induces clots, but does this with or without tissue damage. This is because batroxobin is not inhibited by specific cofactors like thrombin is. These clots can block a vein and hinder blood flow.

=== The differences between thrombin and batroxobin in binding fibrinogen ===
Fibrinogen is a dimeric glycoprotein, which contains two pairs of Aα-, Bβ- peptide chains and y- chains. There are two isoforms of this fibrinogen, one with two yA-chains (yA/yA) and one with a yA-chain and a y’-chain (yA,y’) When fibrinogen is cleaved by thrombin, it releases fibrinopeptide A or B. Thrombin acts on two exosites to fibrinogen. Exosite 1 mediates the binding of thrombin to the Aα- and Bβ-chains, and exosite 2 causes an interaction with a second fibrinogen molecule at the C-terminus of the y’-chain. Consequently, when thrombin binds a yA/yA fibrinogen only exosite 1 is occupied, and when it binds yA/y’ both exosites are bound tightly. So fibrinogen yA/y’ is a competitor to yA/yA, which decrease the amount of clotting. yA/y’ binds with a factor 20-fold greater than yA/yA. There are also clotting inhibitors like antithrombin and heparin cofactor II, which prevent clotting when it is not necessary. In contrast, batroxobin is not inhibited by antithrombin and heparin cofactor II. Batroxobin also has a high Kd value for binding both forms yA/yA and yA/y’. The bindings sites of batroxobin and thrombin partially overlap, but there are some differences. The fibrin-bound batroxobin retains catalytic activity and is a more potent stimulus for fibrin aggregation than fibrin-bound thrombin. This is probably due to the more lipophilic character of exosite 1, that binds fibrinogen more tightly. Fibrinogen is the sole substrate for batroxobin, whereas thrombin has multiple substrates. This is probably due to the Natrium-binding pocket that thrombin contains.

== Toxicokinetics ==
Toxicokinetic studies have been performed on various animal species, namely dogs, mice, guinea pigs, rabbits, rats and monkeys. The research was performed by using immunoassays to obtain the plasma and urinary levels of batroxobin. They also measured the levels of fibrinogen.

=== Exposure ===
Normally the venom is directly injected into the bloodstream by the snake. In the experiments performed they also used intravenous injection of batroxobin. They used a total dose of 2 BU/kg (in dogs also 0.2 BU/kg) given during a time of 30 minutes, three times a day. In the graph below you can see the plasma concentrations of batroxobin after administration.

=== Distribution ===
All the species showed a large Vd (Volume of Distribution). The value of the plasma in animals was around 50ml/kg on average. In dogs and monkeys the value of the Vd was very low compared to other species, namely 1.5 times the value of plasma in other animals. So the batroxobin is distributed mainly through veins and little is taken up by tissues. In the other species this value was around four times higher. This might be because batroxobin is more easily taken up by the reticuloendothelial system in those species.

=== Excretion ===
Batroxobin is excreted by the liver, kidney and spleen. The excretion of batroxobin can be detected by small metabolite molecules in the urine. With use of the immunoassay only 0.2 - 1.9% of the dose was detected in the urine. The amount of radioactivity of 125I-batroxobin was 69% in rats and 73% in dogs within 48 hours. So batroxobin is mainly excreted through the kidneys in its degraded form. So it isn’t detectable with an immunoassay.

=== Metabolism ===
All the species responded differently to batroxobin exposure. This means that their ability to metabolize this protease is not the same. They all have their own half-lives. The half-life in dogs are the highest 3.9 h and 5.8 h. In rabbit and mouse the half-life values were very low, 0.3 h and 0.4 h respectively. Because batroxobin is an enzyme, it is degraded by a protease, and cleaved in smaller unfunctional parts.

== Toxicity ==
An overdose of batroxobin will eventually lead to death, due to hemostatic effects. No lethal- or safe dose has been determined in humans yet. The safe dose for rats is 3.0 KU/kg and for Macaca mulatta 1.5 KU/kg. The lethal dose has only been studied in mice and is 712.5548 ± 191.4479 KU/kg.

== Clinical use ==
Defibrase is the trade name of the drug batroxobin and is isolated from the venom of Bothrops moojeni. It functions as an defibrinogenating agent and is used for patients with thrombosis. The batroxobin from the snake Bothrops atrox is patented as Reptilase and used as a hemostatic drug.

== See also ==
- Ancrod, another medical snake venom serine protease
