= FGL2 =

Protein-coding gene in the species Homo sapiens

Identifiers
- Aliases: FGL2, T49, pT49, fibrinogen like 2
- External IDs: OMIM: 605351; MGI: 103266; GeneCards: FGL2

Gene location (Human)
Chr.	Chromosome 7 (human)
Band	7q11.23	Start	77,193,369 bp
Band	7q11.23	End	77,199,848 bp

Gene location (Mouse)
Chr.	Chromosome 5 (mouse)
Band	5 A3|5 9.83 cM	Start	21,577,640 bp
Band	5 A3|5 9.83 cM	End	21,583,372 bp
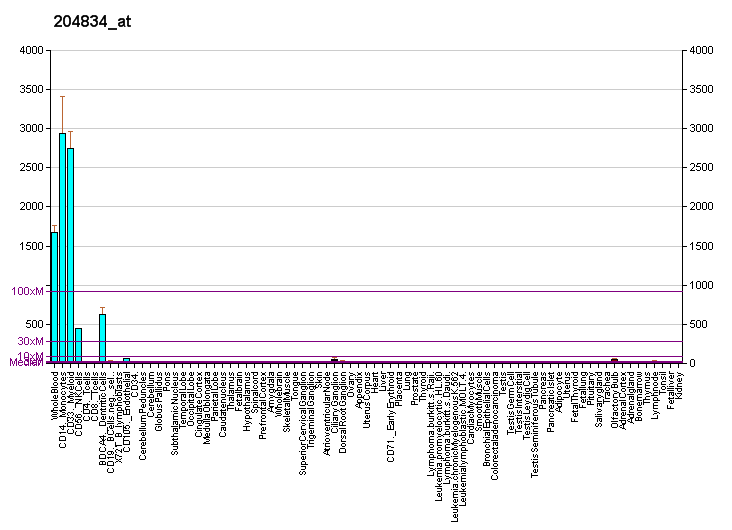
RNA expression pattern
Bgee	Human / Mouse (ortholog); Top expressed in: monocyte; trigeminal ganglion; synovial joint; Descending thoracic aorta; jejunal mucosa; skin of hip; spinal ganglia; superficial temporal artery; urethra; human penis / Top expressed in: ascending aorta; aortic valve; tunica media of zone of aorta; uterus; ankle; granulocyte; atrioventricular valve; carotid body; cervix; endothelial cell of lymphatic vessel; More reference expression data
BioGPS	More reference expression data
Gene ontology
Molecular function	peptidase activity; extracellular matrix structural constituent
Cellular component	fibrinogen complex; extracellular exosome; extracellular region; ficolin-1-rich granule lumen; collagen-containing extracellular matrix
Biological process	proteolysis; neutrophil degranulation; T cell activation via T cell receptor contact with antigen bound to MHC molecule on antigen presenting cell; immunoglobulin production involved in immunoglobulin-mediated immune response; negative regulation of dendritic cell antigen processing and presentation; negative regulation of macrophage antigen processing and presentation; negative regulation of defense response to virus; negative regulation of memory T cell differentiation
Sources:Amigo / QuickGO
Orthologs
Databases	NCBI: entry; OMA: entry
Species	Human	Mouse
Entrez	10875	14190
Ensembl	ENSG00000127951	ENSMUSG00000039899
UniProt	Q14314	P12804
RefSeq (mRNA)	NM_006682	NM_008013
RefSeq (protein)	NP_006673	NP_032039
Location (UCSC)	Chr 7: 77.19 – 77.2 Mb	Chr 5: 21.58 – 21.58 Mb
PubMed search
- Wikidata
View/Edit Human	View/Edit Mouse

Fibrinogen-like protein 2, also known as FGL2, is a protein which in humans is encoded by the FGL2 gene.

== Structure ==
FGL2 is a 439 amino acid secreted protein that is similar to the β- and γ-chains of fibrinogen. The carboxyl-terminus of the encoded protein consists of the fibrinogen-related domains (FRED). The encoded protein forms a tetrameric complex which is stabilized by interchain disulfide bonds.

== Function ==
This protein may play a role in physiologic functions at mucosal sites.

FGL2 is a protein that exhibits pleiotropic effects within the body and is an important immune regulator of both innate and adaptive responses. The protein exists as both a Type II transmembrane protein (with the carboxy terminus on the extracellular side of the plasma membrane) found on the surface of macrophages and endothelial cells and can be constitutively secreted by both CD4+ and CD8+ T cells.

== Variants ==
=== Membrane bound ===
Membrane bound FGL2 (mFGL2) exhibits a prothrombinase activity, resulting in fibrin deposition, vascular thrombosis and tissue inflammation within an affected tissue, largely contributing to the innate arm of immunity. Through mFGL2’s actions of promoting vascular thrombosis and tissue inflammation, it has been implicated in the pathogenesis of viral-induced fulminant hepatitis in acute hepatitis B infections. Hepatocellular necrosis ensues rapidly, due to the HBV nucleocapsid protein’s ability to markedly upregulate expression of the mFGL2 prothrombinase, leading to fibrin deposition within the vasculature networks that supply blood to the liver.

=== Secreted ===
In addition to its constitutive secretion by CD4+ and CD8+ T cells, the secreted form of FGL2 (sFGL2) can be inducibly secreted by Foxp3+ CD4+ CD25+ T regulatory cells (T_{reg}s). Such T_{reg} cells play a vital role in dampening the immune response after the clearance of an infection to prevent sterile inflammation. These cells also play a fundamental role in maintaining self tolerance by suppressing the activation and expansion of self-reactive lymphocytes that may instigate autoimmunity.^{9} Through their roles in immune homeostasis, it has been shown that depletion of the T_{reg} cell population in murine models for disease lead to enhanced immune responses to a variety of infectious agents including hepatitis C virus (HCV).^{10} Additionally, patients with a chronic HCV infection were shown to have higher counts of T_{reg} cells in peripheral blood when compared with successfully treated or healthy controls.^{11}

Secreted FGL2 (sFGL2) plays a role as a negative regulator of the Immune response. sFGL2 inhibits the adaptive immune response. Knockout mice for FGL2 have T cells that are hyperproliferative. sFGL2 is capable of inhibiting the proliferation of T cells stimulated by alloantigens and this inhibition is alleviated by the addition of a monoclonal antibody against sFGL2’s fibrinogen-like domain (FRED).^{12} When the supernatants of these T cell cultures are analyzed, they showed a predominant Th2 type polarization with upregulated levels of expression of interleukin-4 (IL-4) and Interleukin-10 (IL-10).^{12} There are also downregulated levels of Th1-type cytokines such as interleukin-2 (IL-2) and interferon γ (IFN-γ). This shows that sFGL2 largely inhibits the Th1 type response needed to activate cytotoxic lymphocytes to clear HCV infections. Additionally, sFGL2 can inhibit the maturation of immature dendritic cells (DCs) by preventing NF-κB translocation to the nucleus and subsequent expression of the co-stimulatory molecule CD80 and major histocompatibility complex II (MHC II). Therefore, sFGL2 may contribute to the negative regulatory activity exhibited by T_{reg} cells.

sFGL2 works to repress immune response through its FRED Domain. The immunosuppressive activity of sFGL2 has been localized to the C-terminal region containing the FRED domain. sFGL2’s FRED domain shares significant homology to the fibrinogen related domains of potent immunoregulatory molecules like cytotaxin and tenascin.^{12} This works to repress immune responses by binding to the inhibitory FC receptor, FCγRIIB. Furthermore, HCV’s core protein has been found to increase the levels of expression of sFGL2 and cause virus-specific CD4+ T lymphocytes to skew largely toward a Th2 lineage, allowing for the establishment of a chronic infection.^{13}

== Clinical significance ==
Human Fibrinogen-like protein 2 may be useful as a biomarker for responsiveness to antiviral therapy.
