= Ancrod =

Chemical compound

Clinical data
- ATC code: B01AD09 (WHO)

Identifiers
- CAS Number: 9046-56-4
- PubChem CID: 347909946
- ChemSpider: none
- UNII: EL55307L15
- KEGG: D02938
- ECHA InfoCard: 100.029.927

Thrombin-like enzyme ancrod

Identifiers
- Organism: Calloselasma rhodostoma
- Symbol: ?
- Orthologs: OMA: entry
- UniProt: P26324
Search for
- Structures: Swiss-model
- Domains: InterPro

Thrombin-like enzyme ancrod-2

Identifiers
- Organism: Calloselasma rhodostoma
- Symbol: ?
- Orthologs: OMA: entry
- UniProt: P47797
Search for
- Structures: Swiss-model
- Domains: InterPro

Ancrod (current brand name: Viprinex) is a defibrinogenating agent derived from the venom of the Malayan pit viper. Defibrinogenating blood produces an anticoagulant effect. Ancrod is not approved or marketed in any country. It is a thrombin-like serine protease.

== Medical use ==
As of 2017 ancrod was not marketed for any medical use.

=== Pregnancy ===
Category X : Ancrod was not found to be teratogenic in animal studies, but some fetal deaths occurred as a result of placental hemorrhages in animals given high doses; therefore, it should not be used during pregnancy as the defibrinogenation mechanism of ancrod might be expected to interfere with the normal implantation of the fertilized egg.

== Contraindications and precautions ==
Use of the drug is contraindicated in patients with known bleeding disorders of any origin or with any unexplained excessive bleedings in the past. It should also be avoided in individuals with platelet counts of less than 100,000, even if asymptomatic, with the exception of cases of heparin-induced thrombocytopenia (HIT). Further contraindications include planned surgery or imminent delivery, active ulcerations of the gastrointestinal tract, and any form of malignant disease. The drug is also unsuitable for patients with renal stones, due to the increased likelihood of significant urological bleeding, as well as for those with severe and uncontrolled arterial hypertension, active pulmonary tuberculosis, impaired fibrinolysis, severe liver disease, or manifest or impending shock. In addition, intramuscular administration is not recommended, since I.M. injection of ancrod can rapidly induce neutralizing antibodies and thereby cause drug resistance.

== Side effects ==
In clinical trials for ischemic stroke, ancrod increased the risk of intracerebral hemorrhage. Hypersensitivity reactions may occur, including local or generalized skin reactions such as rash and urticaria. In some patients, neutralizing antibodies to ancrod appear, leading to partial or total loss of activity and consequent drug resistance. Pain at the injection site is sometimes reported, though it is normally mild and can, if necessary, be treated with local or oral antihistaminic drugs such as clemastine or diphenhydramine. Other injection-related effects include bleeding at the site, thrombophlebitis in local veins, and paradoxical arterial thrombotic events.

Occasionally, deposition of cleaved fibrinogen derivates in the spleen can result in splenomegaly, and strong palpation may lead to rupture, which can cause life-threatening bleeding and necessitate splenectomy. Specific side effects also include local and systemic bleeding events. Local bleeding can be managed with direct pressure or surgical dressings, while the risk of systemic bleeding is relatively low compared with other anticoagulants. If systemic bleeding is severe enough to require rapid reversal of ancrod’s effect, substitution of fibrinogen is recommended (see section on special antidotes).

Other adverse effects reported include increased headache in patients with known migraine, as well as infrequent episodes of chills and fever. Unlike heparin, ancrod has not been associated with thrombocytopenia.

== Pharmacology ==
Ancrod has a triple mode of action. It was found that ancrod's actions are FAD dependent and that the substance has interesting apoptotic properties (causing programmed cell death), which remain to be explored.

The half-life of ancrod is 3 to 5 hours and the drug is cleared from blood plasma, mainly renally.

Due to its special mode of action (see below) and its price, Arwin has never been used as 'normal' anticoagulant such as heparin, but only for the symptomatic treatment of moderate to severe forms of peripheral arterial circulatory disorders such as those resulting from years of heavy smoking and/or arteriosclerosis.

The substance is intended for subcutaneous injection and intravenous infusion, and indirectly inhibits aggregation, adhesion, and release of thrombocytes mediated through the action of a fibrinogen degradation product (FDP). It also cleaves and therefore inactivates a significant part of circulating plasma fibrinogen. Fibrinogen is often found in increased concentrations in arteriae with impaired circulation. This leads to a pathologically increased blood viscosity and thereby to a worsening of symptoms of the circulation disorder (more intense pain, decreased mobility of the limb and decreased temperature, need for partial or even total limb amputation). The blood viscosity in patients receiving ancrod is progressively reduced by 30 to 40% of the pretreatment levels. The decreased viscosity is directly attributable to lowered fibrinogen levels and leads to important improvements in blood flow and perfusion of the microcirculation. Erythrocyte flexibility is not affected by normal doses of ancrod. The rheological changes are readily maintained and the viscosity approaches pretreatment values very slowly (within about 10 days) after stopping ancrod. One of the cleavage fibrinogen products, termed 'desAA-Fibrin', acts as cofactor for the tPA-induced plasminogen activation and an increased fibrinolysis results in return (profibrinolytic activity of ancrod).

Ancrod decreases the blood viscosity in affected arteries, leads to less intense pain, improves physical limb mobility, and facilitates physical and ergo therapy. Finally, ancrod decreases the likelihood of local thrombotic events. These mechanisms also account for ancrod's activity in other diseases.

Effects on other clotting factors: Unlike thrombin, ancrod does not directly activate Factor XIII, nor does it produce platelet aggregation nor cause the release of ADP, ATP, potassium, or serotonin from platelets. Platelet counts and survival time remain normal during ancrod therapy.

== Chemistry ==
Ancrod was originally isolated from the venom of the Malayan pit viper (Calloselasma rhodostoma, formerly Agkistrodon rhodostoma) and is a serine protease. It is one of the Venombin A enzymes. Two genes encoding for such enzymes have been found in the viper genome.

The form used in clinical trials was not made recombinantly, but was purified from harvested venom.

== History ==
The development of Ancrod was based on early studies into the vascular biology of defibrination derived from snake bites. Under the brand name Arwin, ancrod was marketed for several decades in Germany and Austria, until it was withdrawn in the 1980s. Arwin was a brand name of Knoll Pharma.

In 2001 Knoll was acquired by Abbott Laboratories, and in 2002 Abbott licensed the rights to ancrod to Empire Pharmaceuticals. In 2004 Empire was acquired by Neurobiological Technologies. NTI also acquired a lot of unpurified venom in the acquisition, and had that purified for use in its clinical trials.

The failure of ancrod in the 6-hour window for ischemic stroke trial in 2008 led to cuts in staff, an effort to sell off the company's assets, and finally to the dissolution of NTI in August 2009.

== Society and culture ==
Viprinex is not currently approved or available.

== Research ==
For the treatment of established deep vein thrombosis; central retinal and branch vein thrombosis; priapism; pulmonary hypertension of embolic origin; embolism after insertion of prosthetic cardiac valves; rethrombosis after thrombolytic therapy and rethrombosis after vascular surgery. It is also indicated for the prevention of deep venous thrombosis after repair of the fractured neck of a femur.

For the treatment of moderate and severe chronic circulatory disorders of peripheral arteries (e.g., arteriosclerosis obliterans, thromboangiitis obliterans, diabetic microangiopathy and Raynaud's phenomenon).

Ancrod has been shown to be useful for maintaining anticoagulation in the presence of Heparin-induced thrombocytopenia (HIT) and thrombosis.

A small study compared to ancrod to heparin in preventing thrombosis when given to people undergoing arterial graft surgery to treat peripheral arterial disease and found little difference between the two agents.

Ancrod was intensively studied in ischemic stroke, starting at least by the early 1990s. An RCT called "STAT" was published in 2000; it included 500 subjects and ancrod or placebo was administered within three hours of the stroke. Ancrod showed modest benefits but a trend toward increased intracranial haemorrhage. A clinical trial published in 2006 found no benefit if ancrod was given within a wider 6 hour treatment window. Another trial was launched to explore the 6 hour window, but it was halted early in 2008 when an independent review committee looked at the interim data and found no signal of benefit.

== See also ==
- Batroxobin, another medical snake venom serine protease
