= Ciliary microtubule inner protein 1 =

Protein found in humans

CIMIP1

Identifiers
- Aliases: CIMIP1, LLC1, bA196N14.1, chromosome 20 open reading frame 85, Chromosome 20 open reading frame 85, C20orf85, ciliary microtubule inner protein 1
- External IDs: MGI: 1919471; GeneCards: CIMIP1

Gene location (Human)
Chr.	Chromosome 20 (human)
Band	20q13.32	Start	58,150,902 bp
Band	20q13.32	End	58,161,150 bp

Gene location (Mouse)
Chr.	Chromosome 2 (mouse)
Band	2|2 H4	Start	173,364,379 bp
Band	2|2 H4	End	173,370,294 bp
RNA expression pattern
Bgee	Human / Mouse (ortholog); Top expressed in: bronchial epithelial cell; right uterine tube; olfactory zone of nasal mucosa; mucosa of paranasal sinus; right testis; left testis; gonad; trachea; nasal epithelium; testicle / Top expressed in: seminiferous tubule; spermatid; embryo; primary oocyte; spermatocyte; embryo; zygote; secondary oocyte; islet of Langerhans; grey matter; More reference expression data
BioGPS	n/a
Orthologs
Databases	NCBI: entry; OMA: entry
Species	Human	Mouse
Entrez	128602	72221
Ensembl	ENSG00000124237	ENSMUSG00000027518
UniProt	Q9H1P6	Q9DA42
RefSeq (mRNA)	NM_178456	NM_028158
RefSeq (protein)	NP_848551	NP_082434
Location (UCSC)	Chr 20: 58.15 – 58.16 Mb	Chr 2: 173.36 – 173.37 Mb
PubMed search
- Wikidata
View/Edit Human	View/Edit Mouse

Ciliary microtubule inner protein 1 is a protein that in humans is encoded by the CIMIP1 gene (previously C20orf85). This gene is not yet well understood by the scientific community.

== Background ==
=== Aliases ===
- CIMIP1 - ciliary microtubule inner protein 1
- LLC1 - Low in Lung Cancer 1
- bA196N14.1

=== Location ===
It is found on chromosome 20, more specifically 20q13.32. It runs in the 5' to 3' direction on the top strand of chromosome 20. The gene HSPD1P19 or Heat Shock Protein Family D Member 1 Pseudogene 19 neighbors the gene, running before C20orf85, from the 5' to 3' end.

== RNA ==
mRNA C20orf85 has 805 nucleotides which encodes for the C20orf85 protein. So far this is the only known gene variant as of June 2022 and contains 4 exons. It has also been found to be expressed in samples of the testis, endometrium, and liver from HPA RNA-seq normal tissues.

== Protein ==
This protein contains 137 Amino acids and is most commonly called "uncharacterized protein C20orf85", or pfam14945. It has an approximate molecular weight of 15.5 kDa with an isoelectric point of 8.72. C20orf85 protein is rich in the amino acids tryptophan and proline, compared to other human proteins.

== Structure ==
According to iTasser and AlphaFold, the C20orf85 protein structure is predicted to have many more helices than sheets.

== Protein Level Regulation ==
The C20orf85 protein is predicted to be found in the extracellular space or the cytoplasm, per PSORTII, DeepLoc 1.0, and DeepLoc 2.0. It is tissue specific, being expressed in the lungs, trachea, testis, and ovary. There are also 3 predicted sites of SUMOylation and phosphorylation.

== Evolution ==
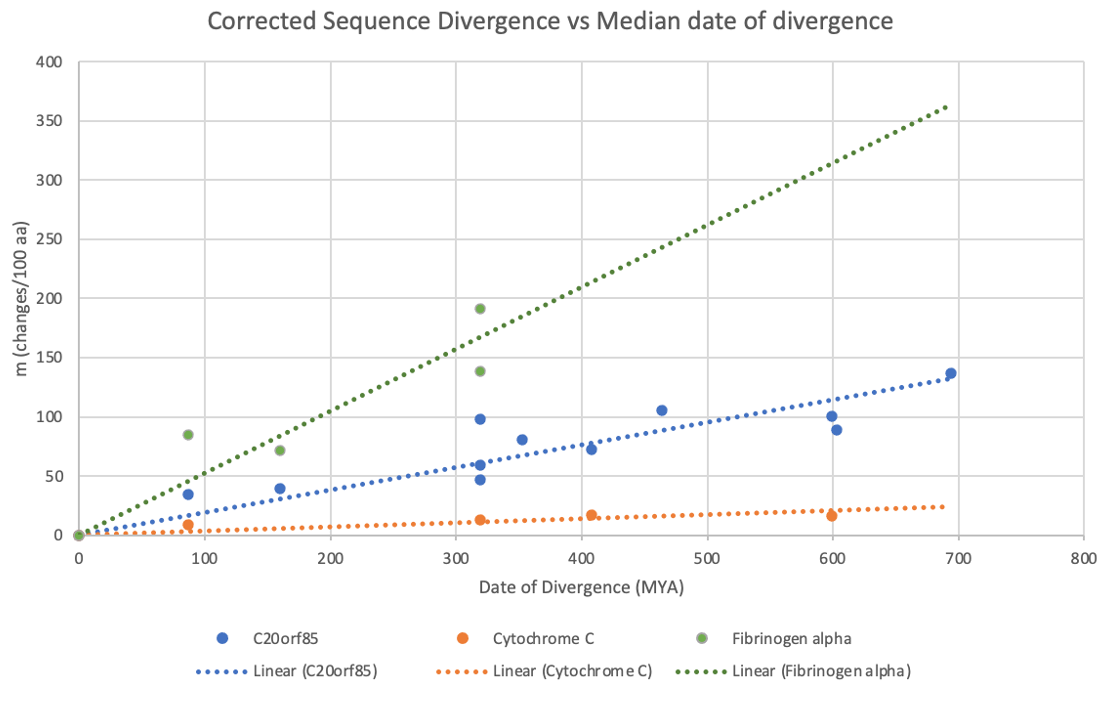
This graph shows that the human protein c20orf85 has a moderate evolution rate. This is compared to the orange trend-line of human cytochrome c which is known to evolve very slowly and the green trend-line of human fibrinogen alpha which is known to evolve at a very fast rate.

C20orf85 is predicted to evolve at a moderate pace, slower than the known fast evolving protein Fibrinogen Alpha but faster than the known slow evolving protein Cytochrome C.

=== Paralog ===
Protein C20orf85 is paralogous with protein c2orf50. The two human proteins have been estimated to diverge from each other around 750 million years ago.

=== Orthologs ===
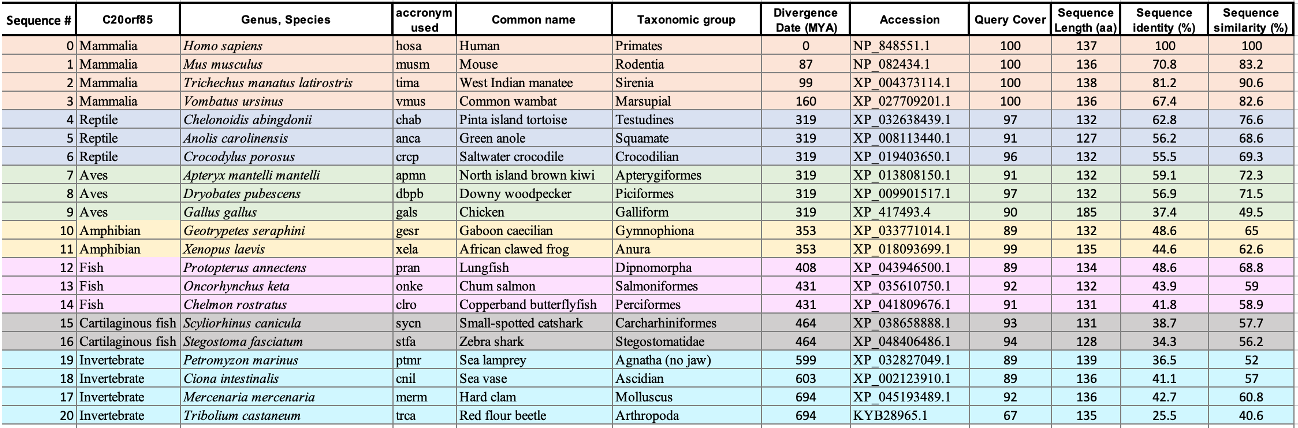
This table is sorted by the most confident numerical value which is the date of divergence, then by the second most confident numerical value being sequence identity compared to the human c20orf85 protein. The colors are then sorted according to class.

C20orf85 has vast amounts of orthologs including mammals, reptiles, and birds. The table to the right shows a wide range of orthologs chosen because of the type of animal they were and the sequence identity.

== Interacting Proteins ==
C20orf85 has many interacting proteins, the proteins below were included because of their association to diseases and similarity in localization with C20orf85.

Abbreviated name	Full name	Basis of identification AND What does it do?	Additional notes
MD2L2	Mitotic spindle assembly checkpoint protein MAD2B	2 hybrid prey Adapter protein that interacts with various proteins	Nucleus and cytoplasm localization and is ubiquitously expressed Fanconi anemia disease
FHL2	Four and a half LIM domains protein 2	Two hybrid prey	Localized in the cytoplasm and nucleus Many associated diseases
ALKBH7	Alpha-ketoglutarate-dependent dioxygenase alkB homolog 7, mitochondrial	Validated 2 hybrid A protein hydroxylase and isrequired to induce programmed necrosis	Mitochondrion matrix but expressed in the ovary, like c20orf85 No likely diseases
CNOT2	Trsncription complex subunit 2	2 Hybrid Various cellular processes, esp in translation	Localization in the cytoplasm and nucleus Involved in IDNADFS
CABP2	Calcium binding protein 2	2 Hybrid Required for the inner hair cells of the ear	Localized in cytoplasm, cell membrane and golgi apparatus Involved in autosomal recessive deafness

== Clinical Significance ==
Research conducted by Kyeong-Man Hong discovered that there is an inactivation of LLC1 (C20orf85) in some patients with non-small cell lung cancer but the reason for this is currently unknown. The research titled "Immunohistochemical localization of LLC1 in human tissues and its limited expression in non-small cell lung cancer" found expression in the lung but no further findings have been evaluated from that article.

=== Mutations ===
There are many mutations found from the SNPs NCBI dataset of C20orf85, these included below were mentioned as described in the "significance" column.

SNP	Position (aa)	Base Change	Amino Acid Change	Mutation Type	Significance	Clinical Significance
rs1207088890	7	A-->G	Ser-->Gly	Missense	Highly conserved with phosphorylation site and O-beta-GlcNAc site	None known
rs907822000	16	C-->T	Leu-->Phe	Missense	Highly conserved	None known
rs780117816	24	A-->T	Lys--> N/A	Nonsense	Sumoylation site	None known
rs200564315	100	G-->A	Gly-->Ser	Missense	Highly conserved	None known
rs754178666	137	A-->G	His-->Arg	Missense	Important to localization	None known
