= Venombin AB =

Identifiers
- EC no.: 3.4.21.55
- CAS no.: 104003-74-9

Databases
- IntEnz: IntEnz view
- BRENDA: BRENDA entry
- ExPASy: NiceZyme view
- KEGG: KEGG entry
- MetaCyc: metabolic pathway
- PRIAM: profile
- PDB structures: RCSB PDB PDBe PDBsum
Search
- PMC: articles
- PubMed: articles
- NCBI: proteins

Venombin AB (EC 3.4.21.55, gabonase, okinaxobin II, Bitis gabonica venom serine proteinase, afaâ, cytin) is an enzyme. This enzyme catalyses the following chemical reaction

Selective cleavage at Arg- bonds in fibrinogen to form fibrin and release fibrinopeptides A and B

This enzyme is isolated from the venom of the Gaboon viper Bitis gabonica.
