= Fibrinogen uptake test =

A fibrinogen uptake test is a test that was formerly used to detect deep vein thrombosis. Radioactive labeled fibrinogen is given which is incorporated in the thrombus. The thrombus can then be detected by scintigraphy.

Iodine 125-labeled fibrinogen scanning is a very sensitive method for detecting subclinical leg vein thrombi. Fibrinogen scanning is less useful for the diagnosis of established venous thrombosis, but is valuable for detecting extension of venographically diagnosed calf vein thrombosis. The technique is safe if fibrinogen is obtained from carefully screened donors. The limitations of the method include its inability to distinguish between superficial and deep venous thrombi, and its sensitivity to fibrin in hematoma and inflammatory exudates. Though the results agree closely with those of phlebography, scanning seems less reliable for detecting femoral vein than calf vein thrombi and is insensitive to thrombi above the inguinal ligament. Screening for these major thrombi may be improved by combining fibrinogen scanning with impedance plethysmography or ultrasonic examination.
