= Neurobiological Technologies =

Biotechnology company (1987–2009)

Neurobiological Technologies, Inc. ("NTI") was a biotechnology company that was founded in 1987 by Enoch Callaway and John B. Stuppin to in-license and develop drugs primarily to treat neurological conditions; the company was dissolved in 2009 after the failure of its drug candidate ancrod in a Phase III trial for ischemic stroke.

The company pursued a virtual company model from the beginning, keeping staff as small as possible and outsourcing tasks to contract research organizations and contract manufacturing organizations.

At the time the company made its first public offering in 1996, it had three products in development: memantine, a small molecule for neuropathic pain and AIDS-related dementia, corticotropin-releasing factor, a biopharmaceutical to treat edema caused by brain tumors and inflammation caused by rheumatoid arthritis, and dynorphin A, a biopharmaceutical to treat pain. It licensed patents covering methods to use memantine from Children's Hospital of Boston in 1995.

In 1997 the company hired Paul Frieman as its CEO—Frieman was an experienced executive who had sold his biotech company three years before for $5.4B. Frieman cut staff from 23 people to 9, and in 1998 amended NTI's agreement with Children's Hospital of Boston to allow the German company Merz Pharma, which had been marketing memantine in Europe for dementia since 1989 and was running similar clinical trials to those run by NTI, to take over development. Merz paid NTI $2.1M upfront and agreed to pay both NTI and Children's Hospital royalties.

In 2000 Merz partnered with Forest Laboratories to further develop memantine, and NTI received about $8 million from the upfront payment. That money covered the approximately $5 million that NTI had put into development of memantine.

In 2004 NTI acquired Empire Pharmaceuticals, which had one product: ancrod (Viprinex). Empire had been formed by former employees of Knoll Pharmaceuticals, the German company that had discovered and started developing ancrod, and had acquired the rights to ancrod in 2002, after Knoll's acquisition by Abbott Laboratories in 2001. NTI also acquired a batch of unpurified venom in the acquisition, and had that purified for use in its clinical trials.

Ancrod became NTI's lead product; in 2006 Frieman estimated annual sales $500 million to $1 billion.

The company collapsed when a Phase III trial of ancrod was halted early in December 2008 when an independent review committee looked at the interim data and found no signal of benefit. One of its main investors was the Biotechnology Value Fund, which put pressure on the company to dissolve and pay out its investors. It cut staff in early 2009, then sought to sell off its assets, and finally dissolved in August 2009.

The company's CEOs were:

- 1991 to 1997: Jeffrey S. Price; prior to joining NTI he had been with Cetus Corporation and then with Chiron Corporation
- 1997 to 2009: Paul Frieman; he had been CEO of Syntex
- 2009: William Fletcher, formerly with Teva
