= Knoll Pharmaceuticals =

Defunct German drug development company

Knoll Pharmaceuticals was a drug development company founded by Albert Knoll and Hans Knoll in Germany in 1886. The company was taken over by German BASF in 1975, which sold it to Abbott Laboratories on 30 June 2002 for $6.9 billion.

It was the developer of several drugs:

Dilaudid (hydromorphone), a powerful and very water-soluble narcotic analgesic (Betäubungsmittel) introduced in 1926, as small oral tablets of a number of strengths, multipurpose (hypodermic) tablets, compounding powder, ampoules of solution for injection, and dry ampoules for reconstitution. Knoll also produced somewhat similar hydrocodone tablets named Dicodid; this drug which compares to codeine as hydromorphone compares to morphine was first synthesised and announced in Germany in 1920. The obverse sides of the oral tablets bear a stylised letter "K" and the reverse has the relevant imprint code for the medication in the locale of sale and/or number of milligrams of hydromorphone.

Sibutramine, a serotonin-norepinephrine reuptake inhibitor, prescribed as an adjunct in the treatment of exogenous obesity, marketed by Abbott but withdrawn from the market in the United States and most other countries in 2010

Propafenone, an antiarrhythmic agent, marketed by Abbott.

Isophan, a slightly modified version of the methamphetamine drug Pervitin, which the Nazi government in 1940 distributed to the German army and air force in an effort to win WW2.

Ancrod (also known as Viprinex), a serine protease derived from the venom of the Malayan pit vipers, was under development for the treatment of acute ischemic stroke; after Knoll was acquired by Abbott, Abbott licensed the rights to ancrod to Empire Pharmaceuticals, a startup that included a Knoll employee who had worked on ancrod. In 2004 Empire was acquired by Neurobiological Technologies (NTI). Ancrod failed in a Phase III clinical trial in 2008, which led to the demise of NTI.
