= Enoch Callaway =

American psychiatrist (1924–2014)

- Born: July 12, 1924; La Grange, Georgia
- Died: August 18, 2014 (aged 90); Tiburon, California
- Education: Columbia University (BA, MD)
- Known for: Contributions to biological psychiatry
- Medical career
- Profession: Psychiatrist
- Institutions: Langley Porter Psychiatric Institute; San Francisco VA Medical Center

Enoch "Noch" Callaway III (July 12, 1924 – August 18, 2014) was an American psychiatrist and a pioneer in biological psychiatry.

== Biography ==
Callaway was born on July 12, 1924, into an old southern family of doctors in La Grange, Georgia. He is a descendant of the family that founded the Callaway Plantation in Washington, Georgia and Callaway Gardens in Pine Mountain, Georgia. Members of his extended family also include Ely Callaway Jr., founder of Callaway Golf Company, textile manufacturer Fuller Earle Callaway, and former United States Secretary of the Army and Georgia Congressman Bo Callaway.

He graduated from Columbia University in 1944 and obtained his M.D. from Columbia College of Physicians and Surgeons in 1947. He completed his residency at Worcester State Hospital in Massachusetts and pursued advanced study at Johns Hopkins University.

In 1959, Callaway was appointed director of research of the Langley Porter Psychiatric Institute in San Francisco and continued in that capacity as professor until 1986, when he moved to San Francisco VA Medical Center and remained there until his retirement in 1994. Among the students he mentored was Monte Buchsbaum, professor at the University of California, San Diego and founder and editor-in-chief of Psychiatry Research. Callaway is known for his contributions to psychophysiology, cognition and psychopharmacology.

He was made a distinguished life fellow of the American Psychiatric Association in 1982. He also co-founded the American College of Neuropsychopharmacology.

After leaving UCSF, he co-founded Neurobiological Technologies, a biotech company that sought to develop drugs to treat strokes and brain cancer.

Callaway was also a published author multiple time over. His first book was "Brain Electrical Potentials and Individual Psychological Differences", published in 1975. In 2007, his book Asylum: A Mid-Century Madhouse and Its Lessons about Our Mentally Ill Today was published by Praeger. (Confirmed on Worldcat.org, where it is OCLC 123029478) In 2012 he had his fictional novel "The Mating Flower" published. Also in 2012, he co-authored "Human Evoked Potentials: Applications and Problems" with Dietrich Lehmann.

Callaway died on August 18, 2014, in his home in Tiburon, California. He was an avid fly fisherman and played recorder in a chamber music group.
