= Paul Morawitz =

German internist and physiologist (1879–1936)

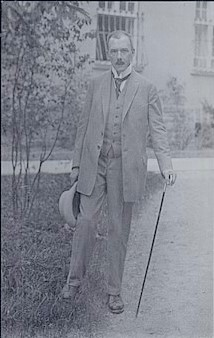
- Morawitz in 1923
- Born: April 3, 1879; St. Petersburg, Russia
- Died: July 1, 1936 (aged 57)
- Education: Leipzig University
- Medical career
- Sub-specialties: internal medicine and physiology
- Research: coagulation of blood

Paul Oskar Morawitz (April 3, 1879 – July 1, 1936) was a German internist and physiologist whose most important work was in studying the coagulation of blood.

== Career ==
After completing his medical studies at Leipzig (in 1901) he completed his army service, then joined Dr Ludolf von Krehl in Tübingen as an assistant physician. Krehl inspired Morawitz in his studies of blood-related pathology. In 1907 he completed a dissertation on blood circulation (for his Habilitation), and he was appointed in the same year as chief clinician of the University clinic at Freiburg im Breisgau. He progressed to become the Ordinarius and Director of the Medical inpatients at Greifswald in 1913, and in 1921 he took up a position in Würzburg. Finally, in 1926, he assumed the chair of Medicine in Leipzig. He died aged 57 of a heart attack.

Morawitz was a pioneer in the study of coagulation, and a 1905 landmark paper is still regarded as a springboard for further study of the physiology of blood; he perfected observations made earlier by Alexander Schmidt and described four coagulation factors: fibrinogen (I), prothrombin (II), thrombokinase (III) and calcium (IV). He also pioneered blood transfusion, initially without the benefit of blood typing, and studied angina and the use of quinidine as an antiarrhythmic. He established a blood bank in Leipzig.

He is commemorated by the annual "Paul Morawitz prize" by the Deutsche Gesellschaft für Kardiologie (German Cardiological Association).
