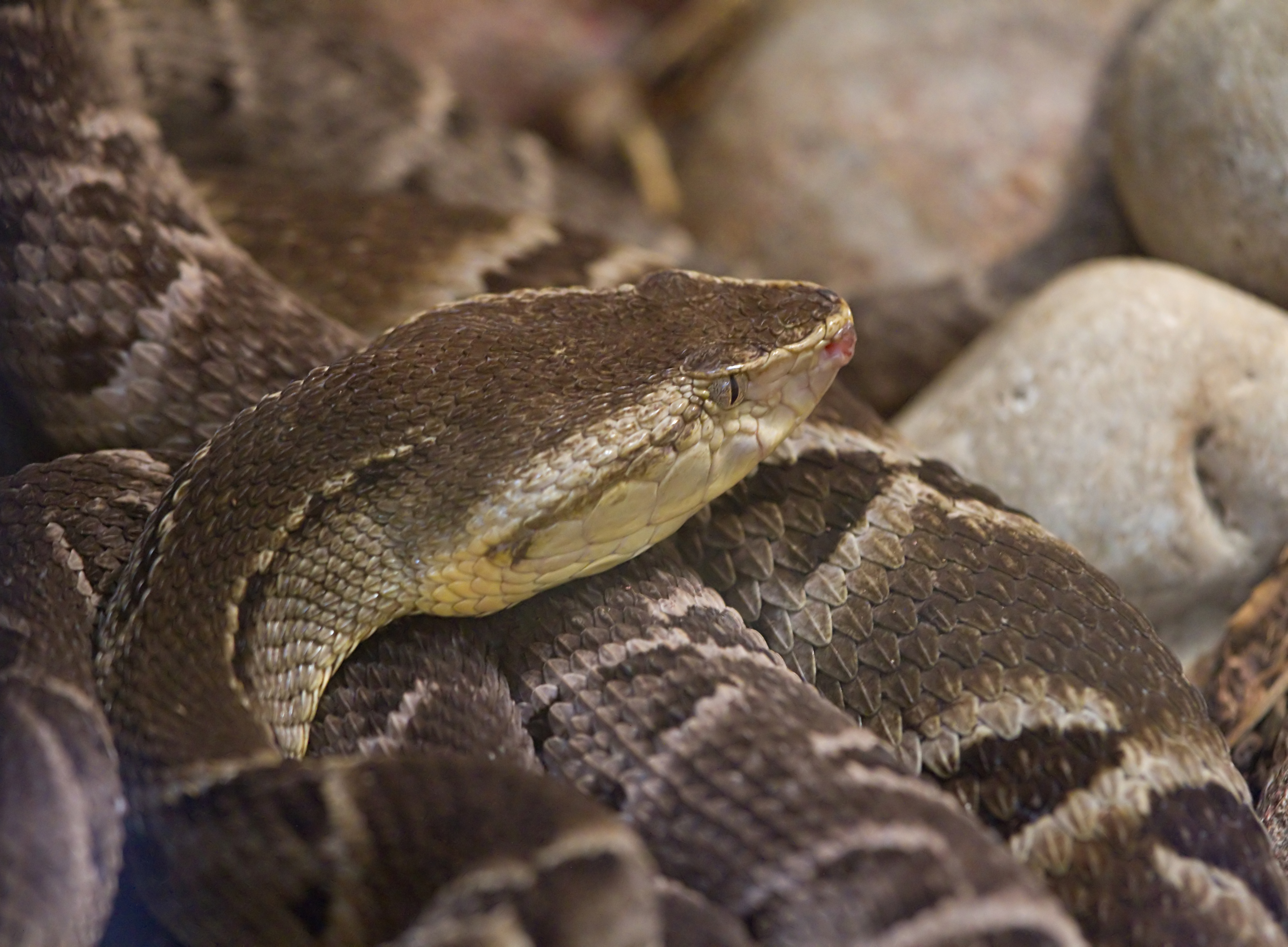

Scientific classification
- Kingdom: Animalia
- Phylum: Chordata
- Class: Reptilia
- Order: Squamata
- Suborder: Serpentes
- Family: Viperidae
- Genus: Bothrops
- Species: B. moojeni

Binomial name
- Bothrops moojeni Hoge, 1966

= Bothrops moojeni =

Species of snake

Bothrops moojeni, commonly known in English as the Brazilian lancehead, is a species of highly venomous snake in the family Viperidae. It is a pit viper endemic to South America.

== Etymology ==
The specific name, moojeni, is in honor of Brazilian zoologist João Moojen de Oliveira (1904–1985).

== Description and behavior ==
Bothrops moojeni grows to an average total length (tail included) of 1.6 m (5.2 ft), with a maximum of 2.3 m (7.5 ft) already reported. It has a tan, gray-brown or olive-gray color, with 14–21 trapezoidal side markings that are dark gray or completely black. There are 23–29 rows of dorsal scales on the body. The belly is usually white or cream, with scattered dark gray spots. Juveniles have a white tail. The species is terrestrial and nocturnal.

It is considered very defensive. Its body varies from medium to heavy. The broad head is flattened in a lance shape when seen from above, and is distinct from the narrow neck. The snout is not elevated. The eyes are medium in size, with vertically elliptical pupils. The dorsal scales are keeled. B. moojeni is viviparous. Gestation lasts around four months, occurs once a year, and litter size is usually 12–14 neonates. B. moojeni lives an average of 15 years. It preys on small mammals, birds, lizards, snakes and amphibians.

== Geographic distribution ==
Bothrops moojeni is found in northern Argentina, eastern Bolivia, Brazil, and Paraguay.

The type locality is Brasília, Distrito Federal, Brazil.

== Habitat ==
B. moojeni inhabits Araucaria moist forests and the Cerrado.

== Common names ==
In South America common names for Bothrops moojeni include caiçaca, caissaca, caiçara, jacuruçu, and jararacão.

== Venom ==
The venom of Bothrops moojeni has hemolytic and proteolytic action. The venom contains a wide variety of enzymes, such as acidic phospholipase, base A phospholipase, metalloproteinases, serine proteinases, L-amino acid oxidase, and a myotoxin phospholipase A2. The myotoxin phospholipase A2 causes necrosis in muscle fibers, releasing creatine kinase. Symptoms may include intense local pain, edema, muscular necrosis. The venom has an anticoagulant effect on the blood, makes the blood uncoagulable, causes severe hemorrhage and strokes.

Moojenactivase, a procoagulant metalloproteinase is capable to induce DIC with a high toxic potency, characterized by prolongation of Prothrombin and activated partial thromboplastin time, consumption of fibrinogen and the plasma coagulation factors like Factor X and II, and thrombocytopenia, it also caused Intravascular hemolysis. The venom has a lethal dose of 0.205 mg / kg for horses. The average yield for an adult female is 335 mg, 63 mg for newborns. Specimens from Minas Gerais, Brazil have been reported to yield 118 mg. Specimens from Argentina have a yield of 248.0 ± 37 mg.

A serine protease was determined by de novo mass spectrometry-based sequencing.
