= Fibrinogen beta chain =

Protein-coding gene in the species Homo sapiens

FGB
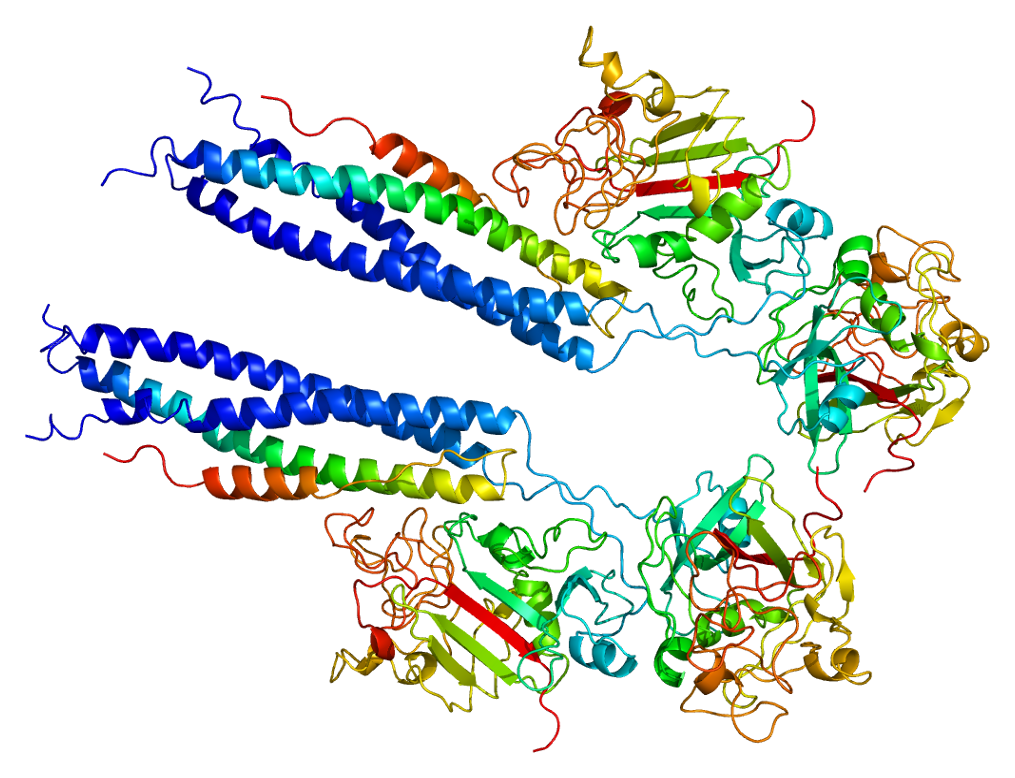

Identifiers
- Aliases: FGB, HEL-S-78p, fibrinogen beta chain
- External IDs: OMIM: 134830; MGI: 99501; GeneCards: FGB
Available structures
PDB	Ortholog search: PDBe RCSB
PDB	List of PDB id codes 1FZA, 1FZB, 1FZC, 1FZE, 1FZF, 1FZG, 1LT9, 1LTJ, 1N86, 1N8E, 1RE3, 1RE4, 1RF0, 1RF1, 2A45, 2FFD, 2H43, 2HLO, 2HOD, 2HPC, 2OYH, 2OYI, 2Q9I, 2XNX, 2XNY, 2Z4E, 3BVH, 3E1I, 3GHG, 3H32, 3HUS

Gene location (Human)
Chr.	Chromosome 4 (human)
Band	4q31.3	Start	154,562,956 bp
Band	4q31.3	End	154,571,086 bp

Gene location (Mouse)
Chr.	Chromosome 3 (mouse)
Band	3 E3|3 36.98 cM	Start	82,947,448 bp
Band	3 E3|3 36.98 cM	End	82,957,170 bp
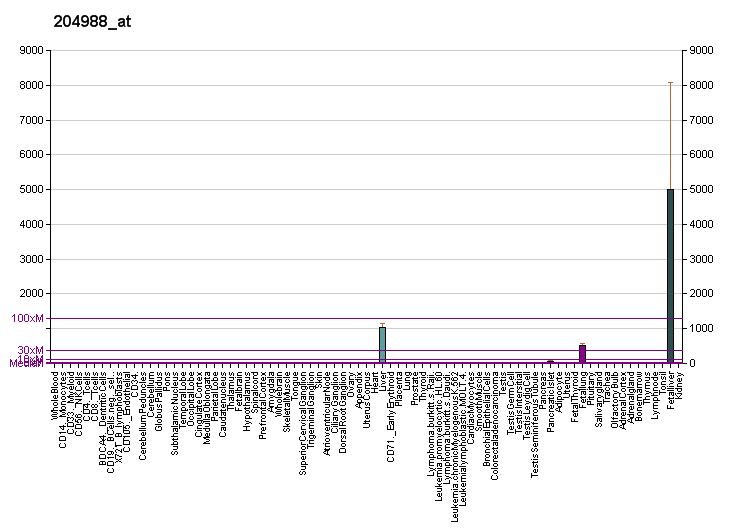

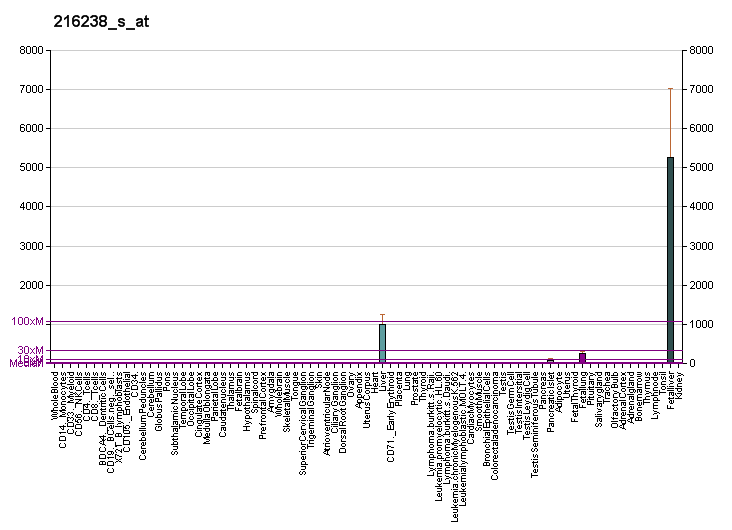
RNA expression pattern
Bgee	Human / Mouse (ortholog); Top expressed in: right lobe of liver; beta cell; gonad; human kidney; kidney tubule; testicle; metanephric glomerulus; epithelium of colon; decidua; body of stomach / Top expressed in: left lobe of liver; human fetus; yolk sac; fetal liver hematopoietic progenitor cell; gallbladder; abdominal wall; sexually immature organism; primitive streak; embryo; semi-lunar valve; More reference expression data
BioGPS	More reference expression data
Gene ontology
Molecular function	protein-macromolecule adaptor activity; chaperone binding; structural molecule activity; protein binding; signaling receptor binding; cell adhesion molecule binding; extracellular matrix structural constituent
Cellular component	cytoplasm; platelet alpha granule; extracellular vesicle; blood microparticle; plasma membrane; fibrinogen complex; extracellular region; cell surface; cell cortex; extracellular exosome; platelet alpha granule lumen; external side of plasma membrane; extracellular space; endoplasmic reticulum; synapse; collagen-containing extracellular matrix
Biological process	hemostasis; negative regulation of endothelial cell apoptotic process; positive regulation of peptide hormone secretion; protein polymerization; positive regulation of heterotypic cell-cell adhesion; adaptive immune response; fibrinolysis; immune system process; platelet degranulation; blood coagulation; extracellular matrix organization; cellular response to leptin stimulus; response to calcium ion; positive regulation of substrate adhesion-dependent cell spreading; negative regulation of extrinsic apoptotic signaling pathway via death domain receptors; positive regulation of vasoconstriction; cellular response to interleukin-1; positive regulation of protein secretion; positive regulation of ERK1 and ERK2 cascade; positive regulation of exocytosis; blood coagulation, fibrin clot formation; plasminogen activation; innate immune response; cell-matrix adhesion; platelet aggregation; signal transduction; induction of bacterial agglutination; platelet activation; toll-like receptor signaling pathway
Sources:Amigo / QuickGO
Orthologs
Databases	NCBI: entry; OMA: entry
Species	Human	Mouse
Entrez	2244	110135
Ensembl	ENSG00000171564	ENSMUSG00000033831
UniProt	P02675	Q8K0E8
RefSeq (mRNA)	NM_001184741; NM_005141	NM_181849
RefSeq (protein)	NP_001171670; NP_005132; NP_001369688; NP_001369689; NP_001369690 NP_001369691; NP_001369692; NP_001369693; NP_001369694	NP_862897
Location (UCSC)	Chr 4: 154.56 – 154.57 Mb	Chr 3: 82.95 – 82.96 Mb
PubMed search
- Wikidata
View/Edit Human	View/Edit Mouse

Fibrinogen beta chain, also known as FGB, is a gene found in humans and most other vertebrates with a similar system of blood coagulation.

The protein encoded by this gene is the beta component of fibrinogen, a blood-borne glycoprotein composed of three pairs of nonidentical polypeptide chains. Following vascular injury, fibrinogen is cleaved by thrombin to form fibrin which is the most abundant component of blood clots. In addition, various cleavage products of fibrinogen and fibrin regulate cell adhesion and spreading, display vasoconstrictor and chemotactic activities, and are mitogens for several cell types. Mutations in this gene lead to several disorders, including afibrinogenemia, dysfibrinogenemia, hypodysfibrinogenemia and thrombotic tendency.

== Interactions ==
Fibrinogen beta chain has been shown to interact with Lipoprotein(a).

== See also ==
- Fibrin
- Fibrinogen alpha chain
- Fibrinogen gamma chain
