= GPSM1 =

Protein-coding gene in the species Homo sapiens

Identifiers
- Aliases: GPSM1, AGS3, G-protein signaling modulator 1, G protein signaling modulator 1
- External IDs: OMIM: 609491; MGI: 1915089; GeneCards: GPSM1

Gene location (Human)
Chr.	Chromosome 9 (human)
Band	9q34.3	Start	136,327,476 bp
Band	9q34.3	End	136,359,605 bp

Gene location (Mouse)
Chr.	Chromosome 2 (mouse)
Band	2|2 A3	Start	26,205,527 bp
Band	2|2 A3	End	26,238,249 bp
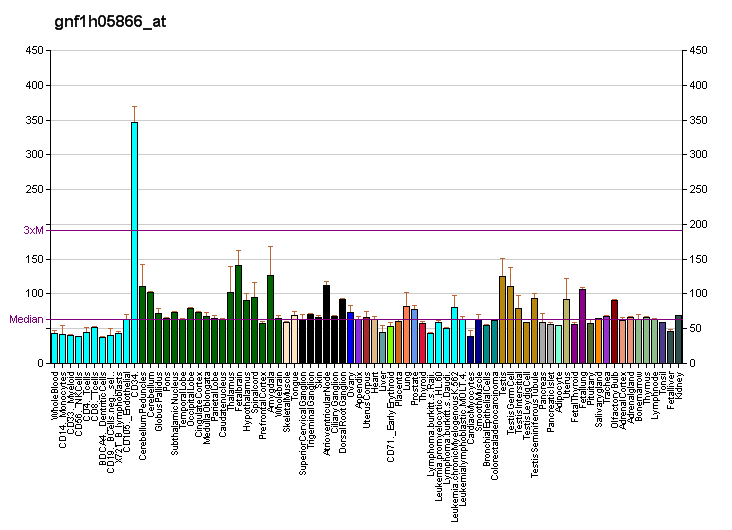
RNA expression pattern
Bgee	Human / Mouse (ortholog); Top expressed in: tibia; cardiac muscle tissue of right atrium; right hemisphere of cerebellum; retinal pigment epithelium; apex of heart; myocardium of left ventricle; ganglionic eminence; cerebellar vermis; sural nerve; right auricle of heart / Top expressed in: Rostral migratory stream; neural layer of retina; saccule; barrel cortex; cerebellar cortex; olfactory bulb; atrioventricular valve; fossa; otic placode; substantia nigra; More reference expression data
BioGPS	More reference expression data
Gene ontology
Molecular function	protein binding; GTPase regulator activity; GDP-dissociation inhibitor activity
Cellular component	cytoplasm; cytosol; Golgi apparatus; endoplasmic reticulum; membrane; Golgi membrane; endoplasmic reticulum membrane; plasma membrane; cell cortex; protein-containing complex
Biological process	multicellular organism development; cell differentiation; nervous system development; positive regulation of macroautophagy; negative regulation of GTPase activity; negative regulation of guanyl-nucleotide exchange factor activity
Sources:Amigo / QuickGO
Orthologs
Databases	NCBI: entry; OMA: entry
Species	Human	Mouse
Entrez	26086	67839
Ensembl	ENSG00000160360	ENSMUSG00000026930
UniProt	Q86YR5	Q6IR34
RefSeq (mRNA)	NM_001145638; NM_001145639; NM_001200003; NM_015597	NM_001199146; NM_001199147; NM_153410; NM_001355574; NM_001355575 NM_001355576
RefSeq (protein)	NP_001139110; NP_001139111; NP_001186932; NP_056412	NP_001186075; NP_001186076; NP_700459; NP_001342503; NP_001342504 NP_001342505
Location (UCSC)	Chr 9: 136.33 – 136.36 Mb	Chr 2: 26.21 – 26.24 Mb
PubMed search
- Wikidata
View/Edit Human	View/Edit Mouse

G-protein-signaling modulator 1 is a protein that in humans is encoded by the GPSM1 gene.

G proteins propagate intracellular signals initiated by G protein-coupled receptors. GPSM1, a receptor-independent activator of G protein signaling, is one of several factors that influence the basal activity of G protein signaling systems (Pizzinat et al., 2001).[supplied by OMIM]
