= SPZ1 =

Protein-coding gene in the species Homo sapiens

Identifiers
- Aliases: SPZ1, NYD-TSP1, PPP1R148, spermatogenic leucine zipper 1, CILD38
- External IDs: OMIM: 618068; MGI: 1930801; GeneCards: SPZ1

Gene location (Human)
Chr.	Chromosome 5 (human)
Band	5q14.1	Start	80,319,625 bp
Band	5q14.1	End	80,321,842 bp

Gene location (Mouse)
Chr.	Chromosome 13 (mouse)
Band	13|13 C3	Start	92,711,144 bp
Band	13|13 C3	End	92,712,680 bp
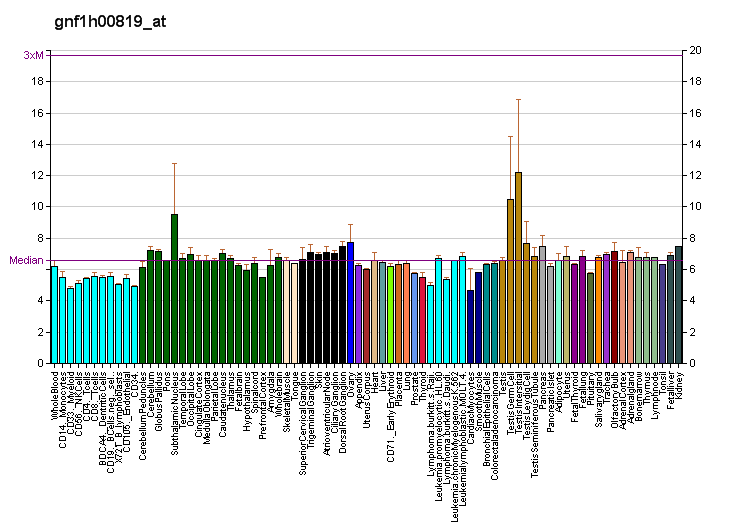
RNA expression pattern
Bgee	Human / Mouse (ortholog); Top expressed in: sperm; testicle; left testis; right testis; gonad; tail of epididymis; endometrium; human musculoskeletal system; muscular system; gallbladder / Top expressed in: seminiferous tubule; spermatid; spermatocyte; morula; zygote; islet of Langerhans; white adipose tissue; epididymis; striated muscle tissue; skeletal muscle tissue; More reference expression data
BioGPS	More reference expression data
Gene ontology
Molecular function	DNA binding; protein binding; DNA-binding transcription factor activity
Cellular component	cytoplasm; nucleus
Biological process	transcription, DNA-templated; regulation of transcription, DNA-templated
Sources:Amigo / QuickGO
Orthologs
Databases	NCBI: entry; OMA: entry
Species	Human	Mouse
Entrez	84654	79401
Ensembl	ENSG00000164299	ENSMUSG00000046957
UniProt	Q9BXG8	Q99MY0
RefSeq (mRNA)	NM_032567	NM_030237
RefSeq (protein)	NP_115956	NP_084513
Location (UCSC)	Chr 5: 80.32 – 80.32 Mb	Chr 13: 92.71 – 92.71 Mb
PubMed search
- Wikidata
View/Edit Human	View/Edit Mouse

Spermatogenic leucine zipper protein 1 is a protein that in humans is encoded by the SPZ1 gene.
