= CEP350 =

Protein-coding gene in humans

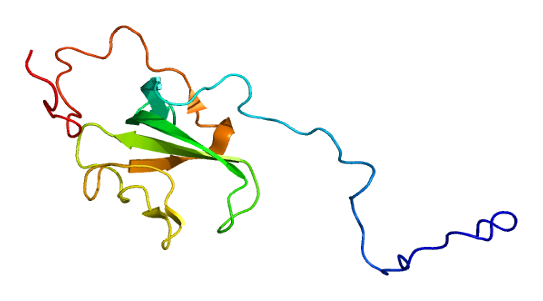

Identifiers
- Aliases: CEP350, CAP350, GM133, centrosomal protein 350
- External IDs: OMIM: 617870; MGI: 1921331; GeneCards: CEP350
Available structures
PDB	Ortholog search: PDBe RCSB
PDB	List of PDB id codes 2COZ

Gene location (Human)
Chr.	Chromosome 1 (human)
Band	1q25.2	Start	179,954,773 bp
Band	1q25.2	End	180,114,875 bp

Gene location (Mouse)
Chr.	Chromosome 1 (mouse)
Band	1|1 G3	Start	155,720,710 bp
Band	1|1 G3	End	155,849,001 bp
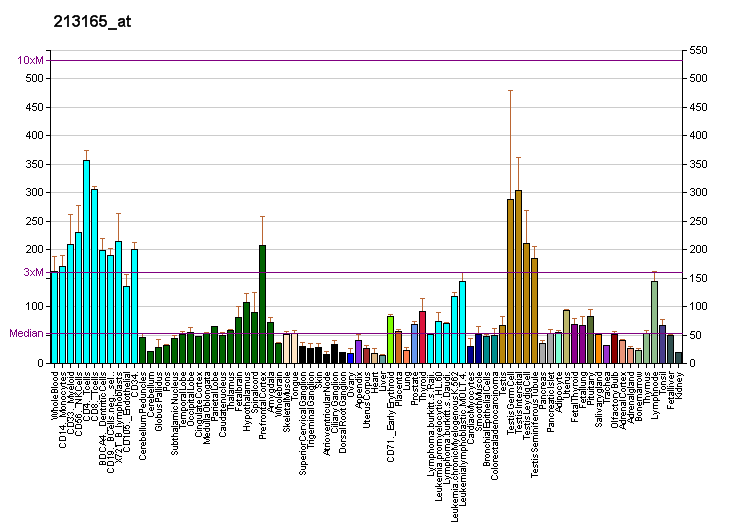

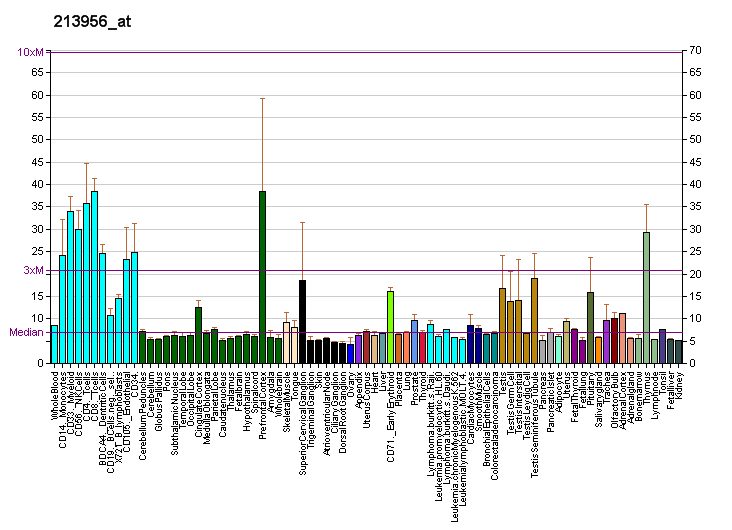

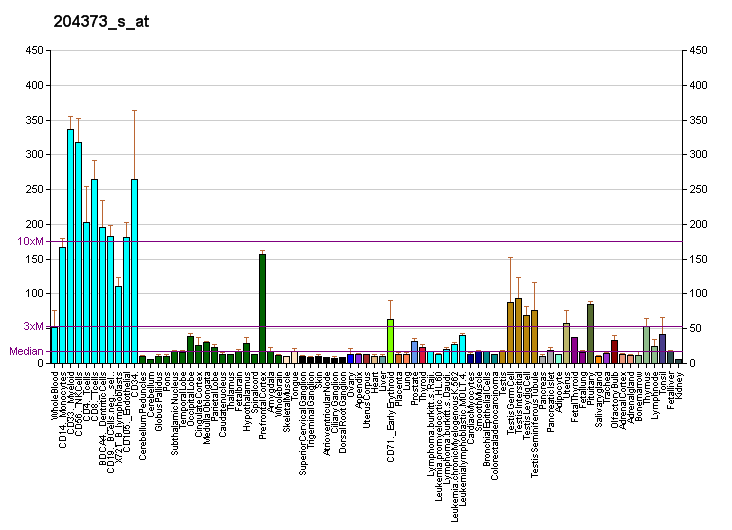
RNA expression pattern
Bgee	Human / Mouse (ortholog); Top expressed in: sperm; trabecular bone; nipple; left testis; Achilles tendon; right testis; optic nerve; pancreatic ductal cell; jejunal mucosa; gingival epithelium / Top expressed in: medullary collecting duct; epithelium of stomach; ciliary body; pyloric antrum; retinal pigment epithelium; triceps brachii muscle; vastus lateralis muscle; Epithelium of choroid plexus; temporal muscle; mucous cell of stomach; More reference expression data
BioGPS	More reference expression data
Gene ontology
Molecular function	microtubule binding; protein binding
Cellular component	centrosome; spindle; cytoskeleton; membrane; nucleus; microtubule organizing center; cytoplasm; cell projection; centriole
Biological process	microtubule anchoring
Sources:Amigo / QuickGO
Orthologs
Databases	NCBI: entry; OMA: entry
Species	Human	Mouse
Entrez	9857	74081
Ensembl	ENSG00000135837	ENSMUSG00000033671
UniProt	Q5VT06	E9Q309
RefSeq (mRNA)	NM_014810	NM_001039184
RefSeq (protein)	NP_055625	NP_001034273
Location (UCSC)	Chr 1: 179.95 – 180.11 Mb	Chr 1: 155.72 – 155.85 Mb
PubMed search
- Wikidata
View/Edit Human	View/Edit Mouse

Centrosome-associated protein 350 is a protein that in humans is encoded by the CEP350 gene.

CEP350 is a large protein with a CAP-Gly domain typically found in cytoskeleton-associated proteins. It primarily localizes to the centrosome, a non-membraneous organelle that functions as the major microtubule-organizing center in animal cells. CEP350 is required to anchor microtubules at the centrosome. Furthermore, it increases the stability of growing centrioles.

It is also implicated in the regulation of a class of nuclear hormone receptors in the nucleus. Several alternatively spliced transcript variants have been found, but their full-length nature has not been determined.
