= Fibrinopeptide =

Fibrinopeptide A

Names
- IUPAC name (4S)-4-[[2-[[(2S)-2-[[(2S)-2-[[(2S)-2-aminopropanoyl]amino]-3-carboxypropanoyl]amino]-3-hydroxypropanoyl]amino]acetyl]amino]-5-[[2-[[(2S)-3-carboxy-1-[[(2S)-1-[[1-[[(2S)-1-[[(2S)-4-carboxy-1-[[2-[[2-[[2-[[(2S)-1-[[(1S)-1-carboxy-4-(diaminomethylideneamino)butyl]amino]-3-methyl-1-oxobutan-2-yl]amino]-2-oxoethyl]amino]-2-oxoethyl]amino]-2-oxoethyl]amino]-1-oxobutan-2-yl]amino]-1-oxopropan-2-yl]amino]-4-methyl-1-oxopentan-2-yl]amino]-1-oxo-3-phenylpropan-2-yl]amino]-1-oxopropan-2-yl]amino]-2-oxoethyl]amino]-5-oxopentanoic acid
- Other names Fibrinopeptide A; Fibrinopeptide A (human); FpA; FPA

Identifiers
CAS Number	25422-31-5
3D model (JSmol)	Interactive image
ChemSpider	17286499
PubChem CID	25078015
- InChI: InChI=1S/C63H97N19O26/c1-29(2)19-37(57(102)73-32(6)53(98)76-35(15-17-48(91)92)55(100)70-24-43(85)68-23-42(84)69-25-46(88)82-51(30(3)4)61(106)77-36(62(107)108)13-10-18-67-63(65)66)79-58(103)38(20-33-11-8-7-9-12-33)80-59(104)39(21-49(93)94)75-45(87)27-71-54(99)34(14-16-47(89)90)74-44(86)26-72-56(101)41(28-83)81-60(105)40(22-50(95)96)78-52(97)31(5)64/h7-9,11-12,29-32,34-41,51,83H,10,13-28,64H2,1-6H3,(H,68,85)(H,69,84)(H,70,100)(H,71,99)(H,72,101)(H,73,102)(H,74,86)(H,75,87)(H,76,98)(H,77,106)(H,78,97)(H,79,103)(H,80,104)(H,81,105)(H,82,88)(H,89,90)(H,91,92)(H,93,94)(H,95,96)(H,107,108)(H4,65,66,67)/t31-,32-,34-,35-,36-,37?,38-,39-,40-,41-,51-/m0/s1 Key: JWICNZAGYSIBAR-LEEGLKINSA-N
- SMILES: C[C@@H](C(=O)N[C@@H](CC(=O)O)C(=O)N[C@@H](CO)C(=O)NCC(=O)N[C@@H](CCC(=O)O)C(=O)NCC(=O)N[C@@H](CC(=O)O)C(=O)N[C@@H](CC1=CC=CC=C1)C(=O)NC(CC(C)C)C(=O)N[C@@H](C)C(=O)N[C@@H](CCC(=O)O)C(=O)NCC(=O)NCC(=O)NCC(=O)N[C@@H](C(C)C)C(=O)N[C@@H](CCCN=C(N)N)C(=O)O)N

Properties
Chemical formula	C_{63}H_{97}N_{19}O_{26}
Molar mass	1536.57 g/mol
- Except where otherwise noted, data are given for materials in their standard state (at 25 °C [77 °F], 100 kPa). Infobox references

Fibrinopeptide B

Names
- IUPAC name (4S)-4-[[(2S)-2-[[(2S)-4-amino-2-[[(2S)-2-[[(2S)-4-amino-2-[[(2S)-3-methyl-2-[[2-[[(2S)-5-oxopyrrolidine-2-carbonyl]amino]acetyl]amino]butanoyl]amino]-4-oxobutanoyl]amino]-3-carboxypropanoyl]amino]-4-oxobutanoyl]amino]-4-carboxybutanoyl]amino]-5-[[2-[[(2S)-1-[[(2S)-1-[[(2S)-1-[[(2S)-1-[[(1S)-4-carbamimidamido-1-carboxybutyl]amino]-1-oxopropan-2-yl]amino]-3-hydroxy-1-oxopropan-2-yl]amino]-1-oxo-3-phenylpropan-2-yl]amino]-1-oxo-3-phenylpropan-2-yl]amino]-2-oxoethyl]amino]-5-oxopentanoic acid
- Other names Fibrinopeptide B; Fibrinopeptide B (human); FpB; FPB

Identifiers
CAS Number	36204-23-6
3D model (JSmol)	Interactive image
ChemSpider	17288791
PubChem CID	16132131
- InChI: InChI=1S/C66H93N19O25/c1-31(2)53(85-49(91)29-73-55(99)35-16-19-47(89)75-35)64(108)83-42(26-46(68)88)61(105)82-43(27-52(96)97)62(106)81-41(25-45(67)87)60(104)78-37(18-21-51(94)95)57(101)77-36(17-20-50(92)93)56(100)72-28-48(90)76-39(23-33-11-6-4-7-12-33)58(102)80-40(24-34-13-8-5-9-14-34)59(103)84-44(30-86)63(107)74-32(3)54(98)79-38(65(109)110)15-10-22-71-66(69)70/h4-9,11-14,31-32,35-44,53,86H,10,15-30H2,1-3H3,(H2,67,87)(H2,68,88)(H,72,100)(H,73,99)(H,74,107)(H,75,89)(H,76,90)(H,77,101)(H,78,104)(H,79,98)(H,80,102)(H,81,106)(H,82,105)(H,83,108)(H,84,103)(H,85,91)(H,92,93)(H,94,95)(H,96,97)(H,109,110)(H4,69,70,71)/t32-,35-,36-,37-,38-,39-,40-,41-,42-,43-,44-,53-/m0/s1 Key: MYRIFIVQGRMHRF-OECXYHNASA-N
- SMILES: C[C@@H](C(=O)N[C@@H](CCCNC(=N)N)C(=O)O)NC(=O)[C@H](CO)NC(=O)[C@H](CC1=CC=CC=C1)NC(=O)[C@H](CC2=CC=CC=C2)NC(=O)CNC(=O)[C@H](CCC(=O)O)NC(=O)[C@H](CCC(=O)O)NC(=O)[C@H](CC(=O)N)NC(=O)[C@H](CC(=O)O)NC(=O)[C@H](CC(=O)N)NC(=O)[C@H](C(C)C)NC(=O)CNC(=O)[C@@H]3CCC(=O)N3

Properties
Chemical formula	C_{66}H_{93}N_{19}O_{25}
Molar mass	1552.569 g/mol
- Except where otherwise noted, data are given for materials in their standard state (at 25 °C [77 °F], 100 kPa). Infobox references

The fibrinopeptides, fibrinopeptide A (FpA) and fibrinopeptide B (FpB), are peptides which are located in the central region of the fibrous glycoprotein fibrinogen (factor I) and are cleaved by the enzyme thrombin (factor IIa) to convert fibrinogen into covalently-linked fibrin (factor IA) monomers. The N-terminal FpA is cleaved from the Aα chains of fibrinogen and FpB from the Bβ chains of fibrinogen, with FpA released before FpB. Subsequent to their formation, fibrin monomers are converted to cross-linked fibrin polymers by the action of thrombin-activated factor XIII (fibrin stabilizing factor), and these fibrin polymers form the backbone of a thrombus (blood clot). Hence, the fibrinopeptides are sensitive markers of fibrinogenesis (fibrin generation), thrombin activity, and coagulation.

FpA is a 16-amino acid peptide. The half-life of FpA is very short at approximately 3 to 5 minutes. Hence, FpA levels provide a relatively transient measure of coagulation activation.

Levels of FpA increase with age. FpA levels also gradually increase throughout pregnancy. Likewise, FpA levels have been reported to increase with estrogen therapy, including with combined birth control pills and menopausal hormone therapy, although research on FpA levels with these therapies appears to be relatively limited.
