= Fibrinogen alpha chain =

Protein-coding gene in the species Homo sapiens

FGA
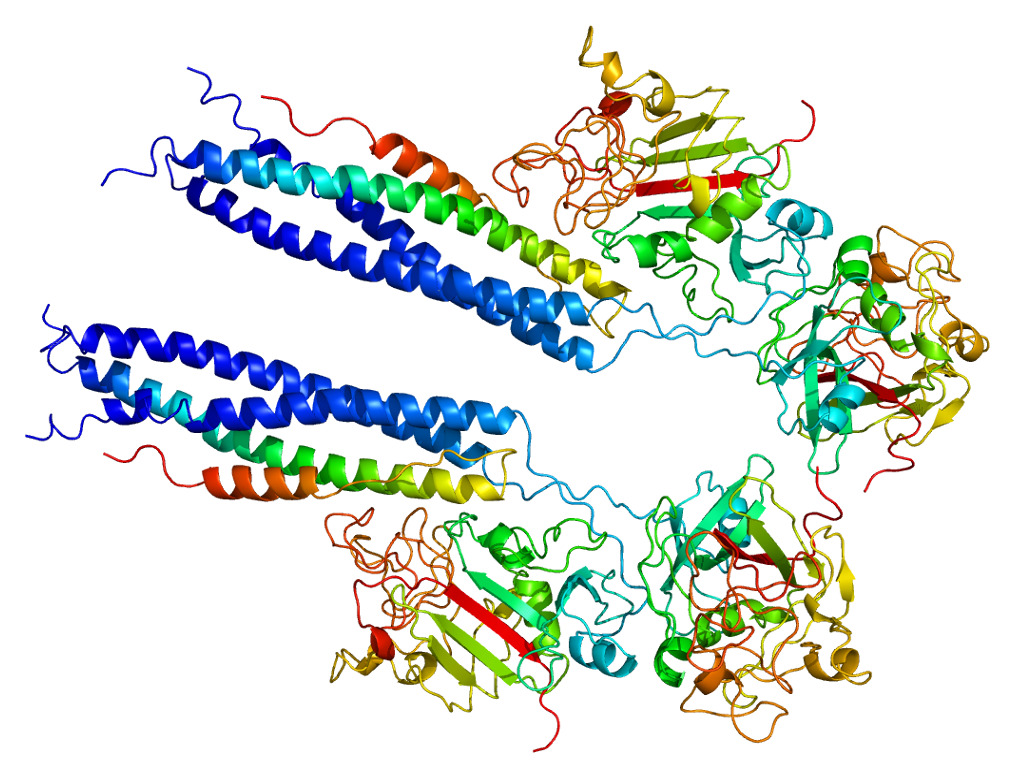

Identifiers
- Aliases: FGA, Fib2, fibrinogen alpha chain
- External IDs: OMIM: 134820; MGI: 1316726; GeneCards: FGA
Available structures
PDB	Ortholog search: PDBe RCSB
PDB	List of PDB id codes 1BBR, 1DM4, 1FPH, 1FZA, 1FZB, 1FZC, 1FZD, 1FZE, 1FZF, 1FZG, 1LT9, 1LTJ, 1N86, 1N8E, 1RE3, 1RE4, 1RF0, 1RF1, 1YCP, 2A45, 2FFD, 2H43, 2HLO, 2HOD, 2HPC, 2OYH, 2OYI, 2Q9I, 2XNX, 2XNY, 2Z4E, 3AT0, 3BVH, 3E1I, 3GHG, 3H32, 3HUS, 4F27, 5CFA

Gene location (Human)
Chr.	Chromosome 4 (human)
Band	4q31.3	Start	154,583,128 bp
Band	4q31.3	End	154,590,745 bp

Gene location (Mouse)
Chr.	Chromosome 3 (mouse)
Band	3 E3|3 36.96 cM	Start	82,933,383 bp
Band	3 E3|3 36.96 cM	End	82,940,934 bp
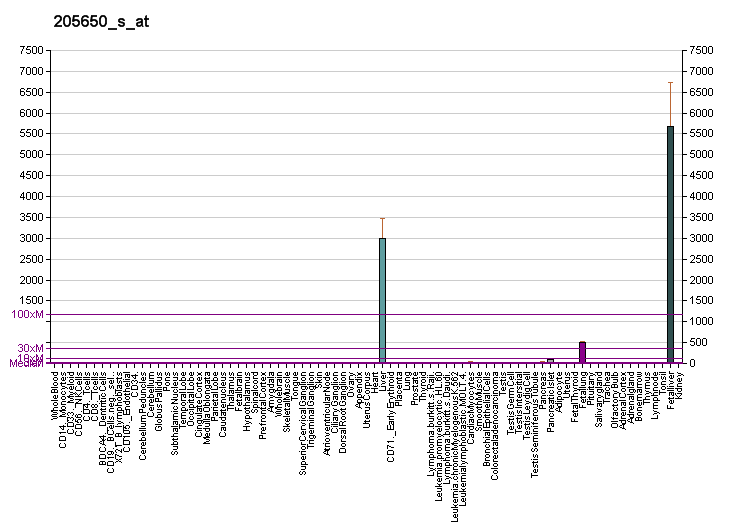

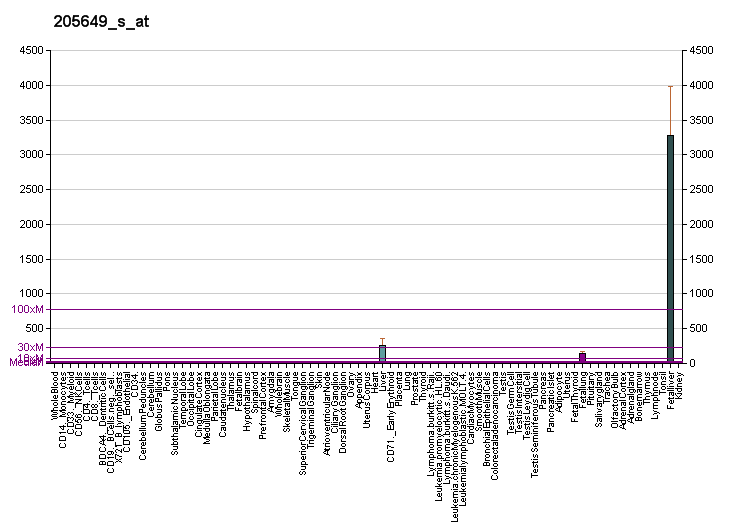
RNA expression pattern
Bgee	Human / Mouse (ortholog); Top expressed in: right lobe of liver; islet of Langerhans; beta cell; body of stomach; testicle; fundus; decidua; cerebellar vermis; cardia; body of pancreas / Top expressed in: left lobe of liver; gallbladder; human fetus; yolk sac; fetal liver hematopoietic progenitor cell; right kidney; proximal tubule; sexually immature organism; human kidney; epithelium of small intestine; More reference expression data
BioGPS	More reference expression data
Gene ontology
Molecular function	protein-macromolecule adaptor activity; structural molecule activity; metal ion binding; protein binding; signaling receptor binding; cell adhesion molecule binding
Cellular component	platelet alpha granule; extracellular vesicle; plasma membrane; fibrinogen complex; extracellular region; cell surface; cell cortex; extracellular exosome; platelet alpha granule lumen; external side of plasma membrane; blood microparticle; extracellular space; endoplasmic reticulum lumen
Biological process	hemostasis; negative regulation of endothelial cell apoptotic process; positive regulation of peptide hormone secretion; protein polymerization; positive regulation of heterotypic cell-cell adhesion; adaptive immune response; fibrinolysis; immune system process; platelet degranulation; blood coagulation; extracellular matrix organization; response to calcium ion; positive regulation of substrate adhesion-dependent cell spreading; blood coagulation, common pathway; negative regulation of extrinsic apoptotic signaling pathway via death domain receptors; positive regulation of vasoconstriction; positive regulation of protein secretion; positive regulation of ERK1 and ERK2 cascade; negative regulation of blood coagulation, common pathway; positive regulation of exocytosis; blood coagulation, fibrin clot formation; plasminogen activation; cell-matrix adhesion; innate immune response; platelet aggregation; signal transduction; induction of bacterial agglutination; platelet activation; toll-like receptor signaling pathway; post-translational protein modification
Sources:Amigo / QuickGO
Orthologs
Databases	NCBI: entry; OMA: entry
Species	Human	Mouse
Entrez	2243	14161
Ensembl	ENSG00000171560	ENSMUSG00000028001
UniProt	P02671	E9PV24
RefSeq (mRNA)	NM_000508; NM_021871	NM_001111048; NM_010196
RefSeq (protein)	NP_000499; NP_068657	NP_001104518; NP_034326
Location (UCSC)	Chr 4: 154.58 – 154.59 Mb	Chr 3: 82.93 – 82.94 Mb
PubMed search
- Wikidata
View/Edit Human	View/Edit Mouse

Fibrinogen alpha chain is a protein that in humans is encoded by the FGA gene.

== Function ==
The protein encoded by this gene is the alpha component of fibrinogen, a blood-borne glycoprotein composed of three pairs of nonidentical polypeptide chains. Following vascular injury, fibrinogen is cleaved by thrombin to form fibrin, which is the most abundant component of blood clots. In addition, various cleavage products of fibrinogen and fibrin regulate cell adhesion and spreading, display vasoconstrictor and chemotactic activities, and are mitogens for several cell types. Mutations in this gene lead to several disorders, including dysfibrinogenemia, hypofibrinogenemia, afibrinogenemia, and renal amyloidosis. Alternative splicing results in two isoforms that vary in the carboxy-terminus.

== Interactions ==
Fibrinogen alpha chain has been shown to interact with tissue plasminogen activator.

== See also ==
- Fibrinogen gamma chain
