= Fibrinogen gamma chain =

Protein-coding gene in the species Homo sapiens

FGG
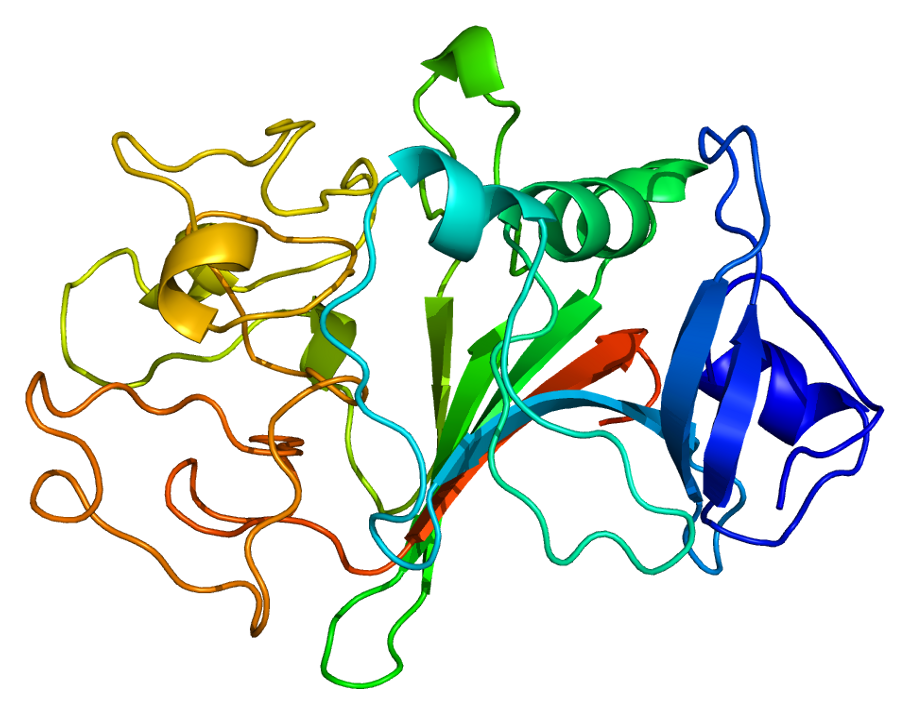

Identifiers
- Aliases: FGG, fibrinogen gamma chain
- External IDs: OMIM: 134850; MGI: 95526; GeneCards: FGG
Available structures
PDB	Ortholog search: PDBe RCSB
PDB	List of PDB id codes 1DUG, 1FIB, 1FIC, 1FID, 1FZA, 1FZB, 1FZC, 1FZE, 1FZF, 1FZG, 1LT9, 1LTJ, 1N86, 1N8E, 1RE3, 1RE4, 1RF0, 1RF1, 2A45, 2FFD, 2FIB, 2H43, 2HLO, 2HOD, 2HPC, 2HWL, 2OYH, 2OYI, 2Q9I, 2VDO, 2VDP, 2VDQ, 2VDR, 2VR3, 2XNX, 2XNY, 2Y7L, 2Z4E, 3BVH, 3E1I, 3FIB, 3GHG, 3H32, 3HUS, 4B60

Gene location (Human)
Chr.	Chromosome 4 (human)
Band	4q32.1	Start	154,604,134 bp
Band	4q32.1	End	154,612,967 bp

Gene location (Mouse)
Chr.	Chromosome 3 (mouse)
Band	3 E3|3 36.94 cM	Start	82,915,031 bp
Band	3 E3|3 36.94 cM	End	82,922,356 bp
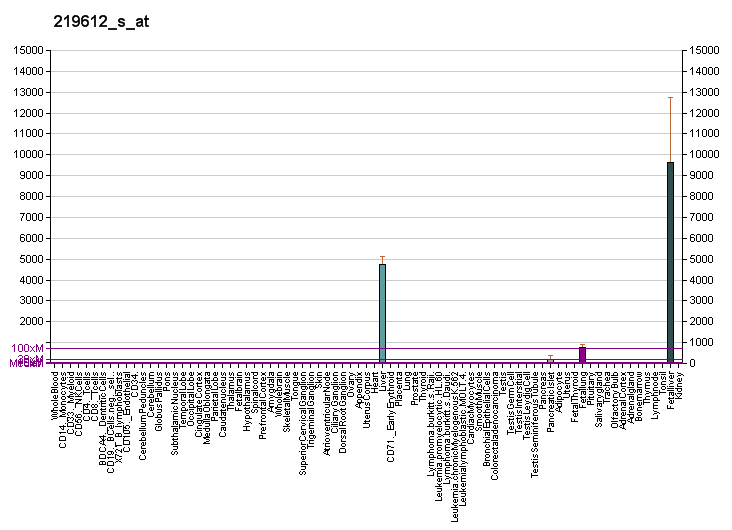
RNA expression pattern
Bgee	Human / Mouse (ortholog); Top expressed in: right lobe of liver; beta cell; decidua; testicle; lower lobe of lung; right adrenal gland; left adrenal cortex; gallbladder; upper lobe of lung; upper lobe of left lung / Top expressed in: left lobe of liver; lacrimal gland; human fetus; yolk sac; gallbladder; fetal liver hematopoietic progenitor cell; parotid gland; abdominal wall; sexually immature organism; primitive streak; More reference expression data
BioGPS	More reference expression data
Gene ontology
Molecular function	protein-macromolecule adaptor activity; structural molecule activity; metal ion binding; protein binding; signaling receptor binding; cell adhesion molecule binding; protein homodimerization activity; extracellular matrix structural constituent
Cellular component	cytoplasm; platelet alpha granule; blood microparticle; plasma membrane; fibrinogen complex; extracellular region; cell surface; extracellular exosome; platelet alpha granule lumen; external side of plasma membrane; extracellular space; endoplasmic reticulum lumen; collagen-containing extracellular matrix
Biological process	hemostasis; negative regulation of endothelial cell apoptotic process; positive regulation of peptide hormone secretion; protein polymerization; positive regulation of heterotypic cell-cell adhesion; fibrinolysis; platelet degranulation; blood coagulation; extracellular matrix organization; protein secretion; response to calcium ion; positive regulation of substrate adhesion-dependent cell spreading; negative regulation of extrinsic apoptotic signaling pathway via death domain receptors; positive regulation of vasoconstriction; positive regulation of protein secretion; positive regulation of ERK1 and ERK2 cascade; positive regulation of exocytosis; blood coagulation, fibrin clot formation; plasminogen activation; cell-matrix adhesion; platelet aggregation; signal transduction; platelet activation; toll-like receptor signaling pathway; platelet maturation; cellular response to interleukin-1; cellular response to interleukin-6; negative regulation of platelet aggregation; post-translational protein modification
Sources:Amigo / QuickGO
Orthologs
Databases	NCBI: entry; OMA: entry
Species	Human	Mouse
Entrez	2266	99571
Ensembl	ENSG00000171557	ENSMUSG00000033860
UniProt	P02679	Q8VCM7
RefSeq (mRNA)	NM_021870; NM_000509	NM_133862; NM_001317105
RefSeq (protein)	NP_000500; NP_068656	NP_001304034; NP_598623
Location (UCSC)	Chr 4: 154.6 – 154.61 Mb	Chr 3: 82.92 – 82.92 Mb
PubMed search
- Wikidata
View/Edit Human	View/Edit Mouse

Fibrinogen gamma chain, also known as the fibrinogen gamma gene (FGG), is a human gene found on chromosome 4.

The protein encoded by this gene is the gamma component of fibrinogen, a blood-borne glycoprotein composed of three pairs of nonidentical polypeptide chains. Following vascular injury, fibrinogen is cleaved by thrombin to form fibrin which is the most abundant component of blood clots. In addition, various cleavage products of fibrinogen and fibrin regulate cell adhesion and spreading, display vasoconstrictor and chemotactic activities, and are mitogens for several cell types. Mutations in this gene lead to several disorders, including dysfibrinogenemia, hypofibrinogenemia and thrombophilia. Alternative splicing of the mRNA chain results in two transcript variants; the common γA chain and the alternatively spliced γ' chain. Approximately 10% of the total plasma fibrinogen consists of γA/γ' fibrinogen, with <1% consisting of γ'/γ' fibrinogen. Increased and decreased levels of γA/γ' fibrinogen have been associated with coronary artery disease and deep vein thrombosis respectively. In the lung parenchyma of smokers, upregulation of FGG transcript levels has been reported.
