= Congenital hypofibrinogenemia =

- Specialty: Hematology

Congenital hypofibrinogenemia is a rare disorder in which one of the three genes responsible for producing fibrinogen, a critical blood clotting factor, is unable to make a functional fibrinogen glycoprotein because of an inherited mutation. In consequence, liver cells, the normal site of fibrinogen production, make small amounts of this critical coagulation protein, blood levels of fibrinogen are low, and individuals with the disorder may develop a coagulopathy, i.e. a diathesis or propensity to experience episodes of abnormal bleeding. However, individuals with congenital hypofibrinogenemia may also have episodes of abnormal blood clot formation, i.e. thrombosis. This seemingly paradoxical propensity to develop thrombosis in a disorder causing a decrease in a critical protein for blood clotting may be due to the function of fibrin (the split product of fibrinogen that is the basis for forming blood clots) to promote the lysis or disintegration of blood clots. Lower levels of fibrin may reduce the lysis of early fibrin strand depositions and thereby allow these depositions to develop into clots.

Congenital hypofibrinogenemia must be distinguished from: a) congenital afibrinogenemia, a rare disorder in which blood fibrinogen levels are either exceedingly low or undetectable due to mutations in both fibrinogen genes; b) congenital hypodysfibrinogenemia, a rare disorder in which one or more genetic mutations cause low levels of blood fibrinogen, at least some of which is dysfunctional and thereby contributes to excessive bleeding; and c) acquired hypofibrinogenemia, a non-hereditary disorder in which blood fibrinogen levels are low because of e.g. severe liver disease or because of excessive fibrinogen consumption resulting from, e.g. disseminated intravascular coagulation.

Certain gene mutations causing congenital hypofibrinogenemia disrupt the ability of liver cells to secrete fibrinogen. In these instances, the un-mutated gene maintains blood fibrinogen at reduce levels but the mutated gene produces a fibrinogen that accumulates in liver cells sometimes to such extents that it becomes toxic. In the latter cases, liver disease may ensue in a syndrome termed fibrinogen storage disease.

== Signs and symptoms ==
Individuals with congenital hypofibringenemia often lack any symptoms are detected by routine lab testing of fibrinogen or when tested for it because close relatives have symptomatic hypofibrinogenemia. Indeed, studies indicate that, among family members with the identical congenital hypofibrinogenemia mutation, some never exhibit symptoms and those that are symptomatic develop symptoms only as adults.

=== No liver disease ===
Individuals with this disorder are usually less symptomatic than patients with other fibrinogen disorders because their fibrinogen levels are generally sufficient to prevent spontaneous bleeding. Those with particularly low blood fibrinogen levels (<0.5 gram/liter) may develop serious bleeding spontaneously and many with the disorder do so following trauma or surgery. Depending on their fibrinogen levels, women with the disorder may also bleed excessively during delivery and the postpartum period; in rare cases, they may have an increased risk of suffering miscarriages. Individuals with the disorder also experience thrombotic events which may include blockage of large arteries in relatively young patients who have high levels of cardiovascular risk factors. The thrombi which form in these individuals are unstable, tend to embolize, and may therefore lead to thromboembolic events such as pulmonary embolism. Both bleeding and thrombotic events can occur at separate times or even concurrently in the same individual with the disorder.

=== Fibrinogen storage disease ===
All individuals with mutations causing fibrinogen storage disease have low blood fibrinogen levels but usually lack severe bleeding episodes, thrombotic episodes or liver disease. Individuals that do have fibrinogen storage disease often come to attention either because they have close relatives with the disease, are found to be hypofibrinogenemic during routing testing, or exhibit clinical (e.g. jaundice) or laboratory (e.g. elevated blood levels of liver enzymes) evidence of liver disease. Unlike other forms of congenital hypofibrinogenemia, a relatively high percentage of individuals with fibrinogen storage disease have been diagnosed in children of very young age.

== Pathophysiology ==
Fibrinogen is made and secreted into the blood by liver hepatocytes. The final secreted protein is composed of two trimers each of which is composed of three polypeptide chains, Aα (also termed α) encoded by the FGA gene, Bβ (also termed β) encoded by the FGB gene, and γ encoded by the FGG gene. All three genes are located on the long or "p" arm of human chromosome 4 (at positions 4q31.3, 4q31.3, and 4q32.1, respectively). The genes are ordered FGB, FGA, and FGG and are transcribed into messenger RNA in tight synchrony. The messenger RNAs associate with the endoplasmic reticulum, translated into polypeptides, and enter the endoplasmic reticulum where they assembled together. The assembled protein is passes to the Golgi apparatus where it is glycosylated, hydroxylated, sulfated, and phosphorylated to form the mature fibrinogen glycoprotein that is secreted into the blood. Congenital hypofibrinogenemia results from inherited mutations in one of the three fibrinogen chains that results in the disruption of fibrinogen synthesis, assembly, stability, processing through the endoplasmic reticulum-Golgi apparatus pathway, and/or secretion into the blood.

There are >25 fibrinogen mutations that have been associated with hypofibrinogenemia. The following Table lists examples of those mutations which cause hypofibrinogenemia that is not associated with liver injury. The Table gives: a) each mutated protein's trivial name; b) the gene mutated (i.e. FGA, FGB, or FGG), its mutation site (i.e. numbered nucleotide in the gene beginning with the initial nucleotide base at the (start codon) of genomic DNA (as indicated by the "g." notation), and name of the nucleotides (i.e. C, T, A, G) at these sites before>after the mutation; and c) the name of the altered fibrinogen peptide (Aα, Bβ, or λ), the numbered position(s) of the amino acid changed by the mutation in the circulating peptide of the mutated fibrinogen, and the identity of the amino acids before-after the mutation using standard three letter abbreviations. In the Table, fs indicates a mutation that causes a Translational frameshift and consequently a premature stop codon (designated by "X") mutation and translation of a shortened fibrinogen chain, del is a deletion, and ins is an insertion.

| Trivial name | Gene: mutation | Polypeptide chain: mutation | Trivial name | Gene: mutation | Polypeptide chain: mutation |
|---|---|---|---|---|---|
| fibrinogen Grand Lyon | FGA: g.5011_5012delCinsTTGGAATTTT (del followed by ins) | Aα: Thr560PhefsX99 (fs followed by X) | fibrinogen Hamilton | FGB: g.7044G>T | Bβ: Asp316Tyr |
| fibrinogen Mount Eden | FGB: g.8035G>A | Bβ: Trp440X | fibrinogen Dorfen | FGG: g.75218C>T | γ: Ala289Val |
| fibrinogen Saint Germain II | FGAG: g.7686A>G | γ: Asn345Ser | fibrinogen Muncie | FGG: g.9402C>T | γ: Thr371Ile |

As of 2016, there have been six mutations discovered to be associated with the accumulation of the mutated fibrinogen in the endoplasmic reticulum and consequential development of liver injury that may lead to liver cirrhosis, i.e. fibrinogen storage disease. Other fibrinogen mutations have also led to their accumulation in the endoplasmic reticulum but have not been associated with liver injury perhaps because these fibrinogens are less toxic to the liver than those that cause liver injury. The following Table lists these 6 mutations. Note that all of these 6 mutations occur in the FGG gene, that all the mutations are missense mutations except for the deletion mutation of fibrinogen Anger, and that the Table reports the gene mutation site as found in cloned (as notated by "c.") rather than genomic DNA. Fibrinogen Aguadilla is the most common mutation known to cause fibrinogen storage disease. The abbreviations in this Table are defined in the previous Table.

| Trivial name | Gene: mutation | Polypeptide chain: mutation | Trivial name | Gene: mutation | Polypeptide chain: mutation |
|---|---|---|---|---|---|
| fibrinogen Brescia | FGG: c.928G>C | γ: Gly284Arg | fibrinogen Aguadilla | FGG: c.1201C>T | γ: Arg375Trp (commonest mutation in fibrinogen storage disease) |
| fibrinogen Anger | FGG: c.1115_1129 (del of GAGTTTATTACCAAG) | γ: G436_350 (del of intervening amino acids) | fibrinogen AI DuPont | FGG: c.1018A>C | γ: AlaThr314Pro |
| fibrinogen Pisa | FGAG: c.1024G>A | γ: Asp316Asn | fibrinogen Beograd | FGG: c.1174G>A | γ: Gly366Ser |

== Diagnosis ==
The diagnosis of hypofibrinogenemia is indicated in individuals who have low levels (<1.5 gram/liter) of plasma fibrinogen as determined by both immunological (e.g. immunoelectrophoresis and (i.e. able to be clotted) methods. The ratio of immunological to functional fibrinogen masses should be ~1.0 as assayed with partial thromboplastin time, activated partial thromboplastin time, thrombin time, and reptilase time tests. These tests are used to distinguish hypofibrinogenemia from hypodysfibrinogenemia, a typically more severe disorder in which plasma fibrinogen levels are low and this fibrinogen includes at least in part dysfunctional fibrinogen. Immunological/functional fibrinogen ratios for the plasma of individuals with hypodysfibrinogenemia for all the cited tests are usually <0.7. Where available, further analyses are recommended; these include analyses of the fibrinogen genes and protein chains for mutations and specialized studies of individuals in vitro induced blood clots for stability and susceptibility to lyses.

The diagnosis of fibrin storage disease requires liver biopsy and the finding of immunologically detectable fibrinogen inclusion bodies in hepatocytes.

== Treatment ==
=== No symptoms ===
Recommended treatment of asymptomatic congenital hypofibrinogenemia depends in part on the expectations of developing bleeding and/or thrombotic complications as indicated by the personal history of the affected individual and family members. Where possible, determination of the exact mutation causing the disorder and the propensity of this mutation type to develop these complications may be helpful. Individuals with fibrinogen levels >1.0 gram/liter typically do not develop bleeding or thrombosis episodes. Individuals with fibrinogen levels of 0.5-1.0 grams/liter require fibrinogen supplementation preferably with a plasma-derived fibrinogen concentrate to maintain fibrinogen levels of >1 gram/liter prior to major surgery. Individuals with fibrinogen levels of <0.5 gram/liter require fibrinogen supplementation to maintain fibrinogen levels of a) >1 to 2 gram/liter at the end of pregnancy and during the postpartum period; b) > 1 gram/liter prior to major surgery; c) > 0.5 to 1 gram/liter during the first two trimesters of pregnancy; and d) >0.5 gram/liter prior to minor surgery. Tranexamic acid may be used in place of fibrinogen supplementation as prophylactic treatment prior to minor surgery and to treat minor bleeding episodes.

=== Symptoms ===
Individuals with hypofibrinogenemia who have a history of excessive bleeding should be treated at a center specialized in treating hemophilia and avoid all medications that interfere with normal platelet function. During bleeding episodes, treatment with fibrinogen concentrates or, if unavailable infusion of fresh frozen plasma and/or cryoprecipitate (a fibrinogen-rich plasma fraction) to maintain fibrinogen activity levels >1 gram/liter.

Individuals with hypofibrinogenemia who experience episodic thrombosis should also be treated at a center specialized in treating hemophilia. Standard recommendations for these individuals are that they use antithrombotic agents and be instructed on antithrombotic behavioral methods in high risk situations (e.g. long car rides and air flights). Acute venous thrombosis episodes should be treated with low molecular weight heparin for a time that depends on personal and family history of thrombosis events. Prophylactic treatment prior to minor surgery should avoid fibrinogen supplementation and use anticoagulation measures; prior to major surgery, fibrinogen supplementation should be used only if serious bleeding occurs; otherwise, prophylactic anticoagulation measures are recommended.

=== Fibrin storage disease ===
There are too few cases of fibrinogen storage disease to establish optimal treatments for the liver diseases. Management of the disorder has been based on general recommendations for patients with liver disease, particularly Alpha 1 antitrypsin deficiency-associated liver disease. In the latter disease, autophagy, the pathway that cells use to dispose of dysfunctional or excessively stored components including proteins, has been targeted using autophagy-enhancing drugs, e.g. carbamazepine, vitamin E, and ursodeoxycholic acid. These drugs have been tested in individual patients with fibrin storage disease with some success in reducing evidence of liver injure, i.e. reduction in blood liver enzyme levels. These and other autophagy-enhancing drugs are suggested to be further studied in fibrinogen storage disease.
