= Utako Okamoto =

Japanese medical doctor

- Okamoto in 2012
- Born: 1 April 1918; Tokyo, Japan
- Died: 21 April 2016 (aged 98); Kobe, Japan
- Education: Tokyo Women's Medical University (MD)
- Occupation: medical doctor
- Years active: 1945–2014
- Known for: discovered tranexamic acid
- Relatives: Shosuke Okamoto (husband), Kumi Nakamura (daughter)
- Medical career
- Institutions: Keio University, Kobe Gakuin University
- Sub-specialties: antiplasmin
- Research: blood / hemostasis

Utako Okamoto (岡本歌子, Okamoto Utako; 1 April 1918 – 21 April 2016) was a Japanese medical doctor working as a medical scientist who discovered tranexamic acid in the 1950s in her quest to find a drug that would treat bleeding after childbirth (post-partum haemorrhage). After publishing results in 1962 she became a chair at Kobe Gakuin University, where she worked from 1966 until her retirement in 1990. Okamoto's career was hampered by a very male dominated environment. During her lifetime she was unable to persuade obstetricians at Kobe to trial the antifibrinolytic agent, which had become a drug on the WHO list of essential medicines in 2009. She lived to see the 2010 beginning of the study of tranexamic acid in 20.000 women with post-partum haemorrhage, but died before its completion in 2016 and the publication of tranexamic acids fatality preventing results in 2017, that she had predicted.

== Education ==
Okamoto began studying dentistry in 1936. She very soon switched to medicine enrolling at the Tokyo Women's Medical University and graduated in December 1941.

== Career ==
In January 1942, Okamoto started out as a research assistant at Tokyo Women's Medical University researching the cerebellum under a neurophysiologist who "created many more opportunities for [women] than were otherwise available at the time." After World War II and the Second Sino-Japanese War respectively in 1945, she moved to Keio University in Shinanomachi in Tokyo. As resources were scarce, she and her husband Shosuke Okamoto changed to research on blood: "If there was not enough we could simply use our own". They hoped to find a treatment for post-partum haemorrhage, a potent drug to stop bleeding after childbirth. They began by studying epsilon-amino-caproic acid (EACA). They then studied a related chemical, 1-(aminomethyl)-cyclohexane-4-carboxylic acid (AMCHA), also known as tranexamic acid. The Okamotos found it was 27 times as powerful and thus a promising hemostatic agent and published their findings in the Keio Journal of Medicine in 1962.

In 1966, Okamoto was granted a chair at Kobe Gakuin University. In 1980, she founded a local Committee for Projects on Thrombosis and Haemostasis with Shosuke, who also worked at Kobe. She retired from the university in 1990. After her husband died in 2004, she led the committee until 2014. She could never persuade obstetricians to trial the drug in post-partum hemorrhage.

== Achievements ==
Tranexamic acid's value remained unappreciated for years, and it was not until 2009, that it was included on the WHO list of essential medicines to be used during cardiac surgery.

In 2010, a large randomised controlled trial in trauma patients showed its remarkable benefit if given within 3 hours of injury. Also in 2010, the WOMAN (World Maternal Antifibrinolytic) trial began, a randomised, double-blind, placebo-controlled study of tranexamic acid in 20 060 women with post-partum haemorrhage. Enrollment was completed in 2016, and in April 2017, the results were published and showed that tranexamic acid reduced death in the 10,036 treated women versus the 9985 on placebo with no adverse effects.

== Obstacles ==
In male dominated Japan, Okamoto had to fight against sexism. She had a supervisor sympathetic to women in science during the early stages of her career.

However she and a coworker were asked to leave a pediatric conference, because the event was not for "women and children" (onna kodomo), a term she said in a 2012 interview she had never heard before. After she had presented her research for the first time, the male audience members ridiculed her by asking if she was going to dance for them.

In the video interview, Okamoto said: "Men are always aware of the fundamental differences between men and women, and so cannot help but think of themselves as superior. So I used that to my advantage by stroking their egos. [...] Until [I had a child] I could compensate for the disadvantages of being a woman by working longer hours—10 hours per day instead of the 8 that the men worked." At Keio University, she could not find day care for her daughter and brought her to the laboratory, "[hoping] that she would behave herself". She carried her on her back as an infant while working in the lab.

== Personal life ==
Utako Okamoto was married to Shosuke Okamoto and at her death was survived by one daughter, Kumi Nakamura. She had one miscarriage, which she said was not related to overworking but "coming home late from work". Ian Roberts, Professor of Epidemiology and Public Health at the London School of Hygiene & Tropical Medicine who had been coordinating the 2010 trauma trial visited Okamoto, then about 92 in Japan. He said that he "found a fascinating character, really lively and vigorous and still very much engaged with research, meeting with researchers, and reading journal articles".

== See also ==
- Obstetrical bleeding
- Women in Japan
- Sexism in academia
