= Congenital afibrinogenemia =

- Specialty: Hematology

Congenital afibrinogenemia is a rare, genetically inherited blood fibrinogen disorder in which the blood does not clot normally due to the lack of fibrinogen, a blood protein necessary for coagulation. This disorder is autosomal recessive, meaning that two unaffected parents can have a child with the disorder. The lack of fibrinogen expresses itself with excessive and, at times, uncontrollable bleeding.

== Signs and symptoms ==
As this is a disorder that is present in an individual from birth, there are no warning signs to look for. The first symptom usually seen is hemorrhage from the umbilical cord that is difficult to stop.

Other symptoms include:

- Nasal and oral mucosa bleeds
- Gastrointestinal bleeding
- Excessive/spontaneous bleeding or bruising from minor injury
- Prolonged menstruation in women
- Spontaneous abortion during pregnancy
- CNS hemorrhaging

== Causes ==
A missense or nonsense mutation to the genes that code for the fibrinogen protein are affected. Usually the mutation leads to an early stop in the production of the protein. Due to the problem being genetically based, there is no way to prevent the disease. Individuals can get genetic testing done to see if they are a carrier of the trait, and if so may choose to complete genetic counseling to better understand the disorder and help manage family planning. Parents can choose to do prenatal genetic testing for the disorder to determine if their child will have the disease.

== Mechanism ==
Individuals with the disorder have a mutation to their fibrinogen gene that prevents the formation of the protein. In normal conditions, fibrinogen is converted to fibrin when it is cleaved by the enzyme thrombin in the blood. The newly formed fibrin forms a fiber-rich network that helps trap red blood cells to start the coagulation process and form a clot.

== Diagnosis ==
=== Diagnostic tests ===
When a problem of fibrinogen is suspected, the following tests can be ordered:

- PT
- PTT
- Fibrinogen level in blood (total and clottable)
- Reptilase time
- Thrombin time

Blood fibrinogen levels of less than 0.1 g/L and prolonged bleeding test times are indicators of an individual having afibrinogenemia.

A suspicion of congenital afibrinogenemia may appear on a platelet aggregation function test.

Platelet aggregation function by disorders and agonists
| | ADP | Epinephrine | Collagen | Ristocetin |
|---|---|---|---|---|
| P2Y receptor defect (including Clopidogrel) | Decreased | Normal | Normal | Normal |
| Adrenergic receptor defect | Normal | Decreased | Normal | Normal |
| Collagen receptor defect | Normal | Normal | Decreased or absent | Normal |
| Von Willebrand disease (except Type 2B); Bernard–Soulier syndrome | Normal | Normal | Normal | Decreased or absent |
| Glanzmann's thrombasthenia; Afibrinogenemia | Decreased | Decreased | Decreased | Normal or decreased |
| Storage pool deficiency | Absent second wave | | | Partial |
| Aspirin or aspirin-like disorder | Absent second wave | | Absent | Normal |

== Treatment ==
The most common treatment is fibrinogen replacement therapy, including cryoprecipitate, blood plasma, and fibrinogen concentration transfusions to help with bleeding episodes or prior to surgery. Although some thrombotic complications have been reported following replacement therapy, transfusions of fibrinogen concentrate are widely considered to be the most beneficial. Fibrinogen concentrate is pure, contains a known quantity of fibrinogen, is virally inactivated, and is transfused in small amounts. There is a lower chance of allergic reaction in response to transfusion. Alternatively, cryoprecipitate contains other coagulation factors, factors VIII, XIII, and von Willebrand factor. There are no known cures or forms of holistic care to date. Most complications arise from the symptoms of the disorder.

== Prognosis ==
As there is not much data out on the life expectancy of an individual with afibrinogenemia, it is difficult to determine the average lifespan. However, the leading cause of death thus far is linked to CNS hemorrhage and postoperative bleeding.

== History ==
It was first described in 1920 by German doctors, Fritz Rabe and Eugene Salomon, studying a bleeding disorder presenting itself in a child from birth. This disorder may also be simply called afibrinogenemia or familial afibrinogenemia. About 1 in 1 million individuals are diagnosed with the disease; typically at birth. Both males and females seem to be affected equally, but it has a higher occurrence in regions where consanguinity is prevalent.

== Research ==
Currently research is based in pharmacological treatments. A case from 2015 was seen in which congenital afibrinogenemia was resolved in a patient after receiving a liver transplant.

== See also ==
- Factor I Deficiency
