= List of fibrinogen disorders =

Fibrinogen disorders are a set of hereditary or acquired abnormalities in the quantity and/or quality of circulating fibrinogens. The disorders may lead to pathological bleeding and/or blood clotting or the deposition of fibrinogen in the liver, kidneys, or other organs and tissues. These disorders include:

- Congenital afibrinogenemia, an inherited blood disorder in which blood does not clot normally due to the lack of fibrinogen; the disorder causes abnormal bleeding and thrombosis.
- Congenital hypofibrinogenemia, an inherited disorder in which blood may not clot normally due to reduced levels of fibrinogen; the disorder may cause abnormal bleeding and thrombosis.
- Fibrinogen storage disease, a form of congenital hypofibrinogenemia in which specific hereditary mutations in fibrinogen cause it to accumulate in, and damage, liver cells. The disorder may lead to abnormal bleeding and thrombosis but also to cirrhosis.
- Congenital dysfibrinogenemia, an inherited disorder in which normal levels of fibrinogen composed at least in part of a dysfunctional fibrinogen may cause abnormal bleeding and thrombosis.
- Hereditary fibrinogen Aα-Chain amyloidosis, a form of dysfibrinogenemia in which certain fibrinogen mutations cause blood fibrinogen to accumulate in the kidney and cause one type of familial renal amyloidosis; the disorder is not associated with abnormal bleeding or thrombosis.
- Acquired dysfibrinogenemia, a disorder in which normal levels of fibrinogen are composed at least in part of a dysfunctional fibrinogen due to an acquired disorder (e.g. liver disease) that leads to the synthesis of an incorrectly glycosylated (i.e. wrong amount of sugar residues) added to an otherwise normal fibrinogen. The incorrectly glycosylated fibrinogen is dysfunctional and may cause pathological episodes of bleeding and/or blood clotting.
- Congenital hypodysfibrinogenemia, an inherited disorder in which low levels of fibrinogen composed at least in part of a dysfunctional fibrinogen may cause pathological episodes of bleeding or blood clotting.
- Cryofibrinogenemia, an acquired disorder in which fibrinogen precipitates at cold temperatures and may lead to the intravascular precipitation of fibrinogen, fibrin, and other circulating proteins thereby causing the infarction of various tissues and bodily extremities.

== See also ==
- Fibrinogen#Fibrinogen disorders
