= Aprotinin =

Antifibrinolytic molecule

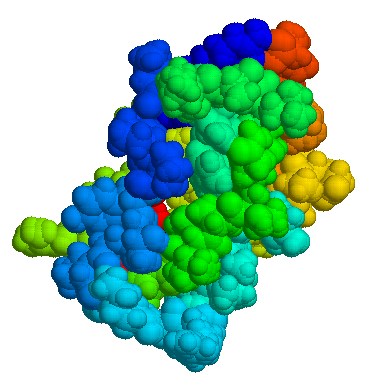

Clinical data
- Other names: Trasylol, bovine pancreatic trypsin inhibitor
- AHFS/Drugs.com: Monograph
- Pregnancy category: X
- Dependence liability: None
- Routes of administration: Intravenous
- ATC code: B02AB01 (WHO)

Legal status
- Legal status: UK: POM (Prescription only); In general: ℞ (Prescription only)

Pharmacokinetic data
- Bioavailability: 100% (intravenous)

Identifiers
- IUPAC name: Aprotinin
- CAS Number: 9087-70-1 9004-04-0
- IUPHAR/BPS: 6570
- DrugBank: DB06692
- ChemSpider: none
- UNII: 04XPW8C0FL
- KEGG: D02971
- ChEMBL: ChEMBL1201619
- ECHA InfoCard: 100.029.983

Chemical and physical data
- Formula: C_{284}H_{432}N_{84}O_{79}S_{7}
- Molar mass: 6511.51 g·mol^{−1}

The drug aprotinin (AP, Trasylol, previously Bayer and now Nordic Group pharmaceuticals), is a small protein bovine pancreatic trypsin inhibitor (BPTI), or basic trypsin inhibitor of bovine pancreas, which is an antifibrinolytic molecule that inhibits trypsin and related proteolytic enzymes. Under the trade name Trasylol, aprotinin was used as a medication administered by injection to reduce bleeding during complex surgery, such as heart and liver surgery. Its main effect is the slowing down of fibrinolysis, the process that leads to the breakdown of blood clots. The aim in its use was to decrease the need for blood transfusions during surgery, as well as end-organ damage due to hypotension (low blood pressure) as a result of marked blood loss. The drug was temporarily withdrawn worldwide in 2007 after studies suggested that its use increased the risk of complications or death; this was confirmed by follow-up studies. Trasylol sales were suspended in May 2008, except for very restricted research use. In February 2012 the European Medicines Agency (EMA) scientific committee reverted its previous standpoint regarding aprotinin, and has recommended that the suspension be lifted. Nordic became distributor of aprotinin in 2012.

== Chemistry ==
Bovine pancreatic trypsin inhibitor
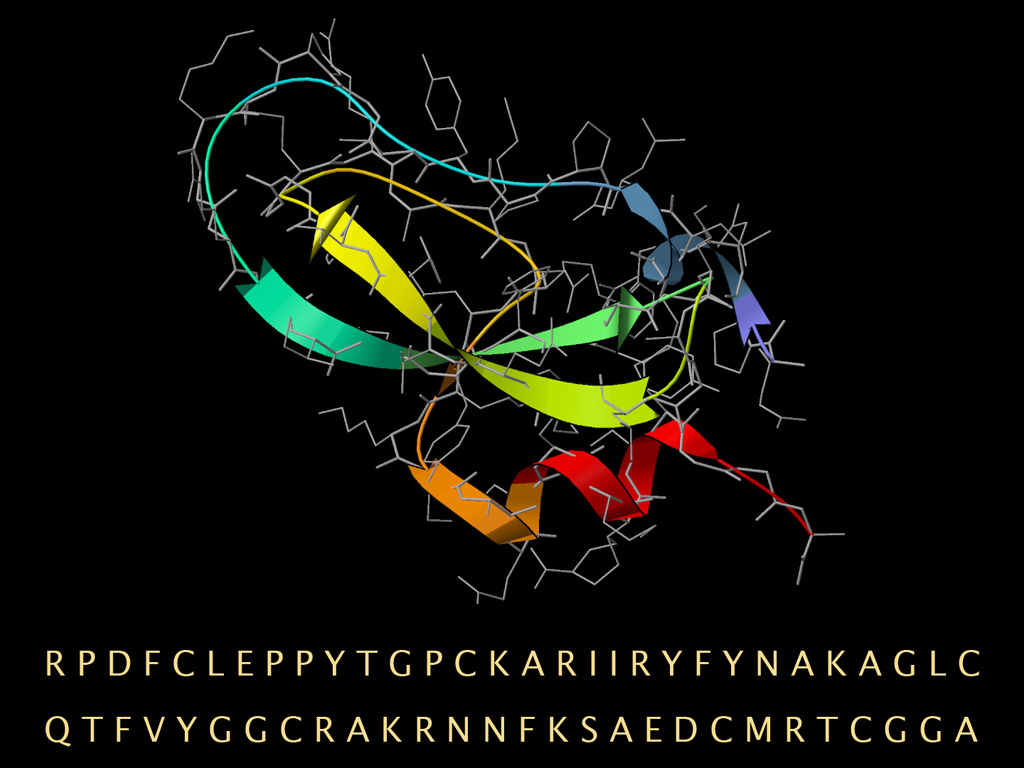
- BPTI sequence, with its folded 3D structure represented by a ribbon for the secondary structure and a stick model (gray) for the backbone and sidechains.

Identifiers
- Organism: Bos taurus (domestic cow)
- Symbol: PTI
- Entrez: 404172
- Orthologs: NCBI: entry; OMA: entry
- PDB: 4PTIMore structures
- RefSeq (mRNA): NM_001001554
- RefSeq (Prot): NP_001001554
- UniProt: P00974

Other data
- Chromosome: 13: 75.02 - 75.03 Mb
Search for
- Structures: Swiss-model
- Domains: InterPro

Aprotinin is a monomeric (single-chain) globular polypeptide derived from bovine lung tissue. It has a molecular weight of 6512 Da and consists of 16 different amino acid types arranged in a chain 58 residues long that folds into a stable, compact tertiary structure of the 'small SS-rich" type, containing 3 disulfides, a twisted β-hairpin and a C-terminal α-helix.

The amino acid sequence for bovine BPTI is RPDFC LEPPY TGPCK ARIIR YFYNA KAGLC QTFVY GGCRA KRNNF KSAED CMRTC GGA. There are 10 positively charged lysine (K) and arginine (R) side chains and only 4 negative aspartate (D) and glutamates (E), making the protein strongly basic, which accounts for the basic in its name. (Because of the usual source organism, BPTI is sometimes referred to as bovine pancreatic trypsin inhibitor.)

The high stability of the molecule is due to the 3 disulfide bonds linking the 6 cysteine members of the chain (Cys5-Cys55, Cys14-Cys38 and Cys30-Cys51). The long, basic lysine 15 side chain on the exposed loop (at top left in the image) binds very tightly in the specificity pocket at the active site of trypsin and inhibits its enzymatic action. BPTI is synthesized as a longer, precursor sequence, which folds up and then is cleaved into the mature sequence given above.

BPTI is the classic member of the protein family of Kunitz-type serine protease inhibitors. Its physiological functions include the protective inhibition of the major digestive enzyme trypsin when small amounts are produced, by cleavage of the trypsinogen precursor during storage in the pancreas.

== Mechanism of drug action ==
Aprotinin is a competitive inhibitor of several serine proteases, specifically trypsin, chymotrypsin and plasmin at a concentration of about 125,000 IU/ml, and kallikrein at 300,000 IU/ml. Its action on kallikrein leads to the inhibition of the formation of factor XIIa. As a result, both the intrinsic pathway of coagulation and fibrinolysis are inhibited. Its action on plasmin independently slows fibrinolysis.

== Drug efficacy ==
In cardiac surgery with a high risk of significant blood loss, aprotinin significantly reduced bleeding, mortality and hospital stay. Beneficial effects were also reported in high-risk orthopedic surgery. In liver transplantation, initial reports of benefit were overshadowed by concerns about toxicity.

In a meta-analysis performed in 2004, transfusion requirements decreased by 39% in coronary artery bypass graft (CABG) surgery. In orthopedic surgery, a decrease of blood transfusions was likewise confirmed.

== Drug safety ==
There have been concerns about the safety of aprotinin. Anaphylaxis (a severe allergic reaction) occurs at a rate of 1:200 in first-time use, but serology (measuring antibodies against aprotinin in the blood) is not carried out in practice to predict anaphylaxis risk because the correct interpretation of these tests is difficult.

Thrombosis, presumably from overactive inhibition of the fibrinolytic system, may occur at a higher rate, but until 2006 there was limited evidence for this association. Similarly, while biochemical measures of renal function were known to occasionally deteriorate, there was no evidence that this greatly influenced outcomes. A study performed in cardiac surgery patients reported in 2006 showed that there was indeed a risk of acute renal failure, myocardial infarction and heart failure, as well as stroke and encephalopathy. The study authors recommend older antifibrinolytics (such as tranexamic acid) in which these risks were not documented. The same group updated their data in 2007 and demonstrated similar findings.

In September 2006, Bayer A.G. was faulted by the FDA for not revealing during testimony the existence of a commissioned retrospective study of 67,000 patients, 30,000 of whom received aprotinin and the rest other anti-fibrinolytics. The study concluded aprotinin carried greater risks. The FDA was alerted to the study by one of the researchers involved. Although the FDA issued a statement of concern they did not change their recommendation that the drug may benefit certain subpopulations of patients. In a Public Health Advisory Update dated October 3, 2006, the FDA recommended that "physicians consider limiting Trasylol use to those situations in which the clinical benefit of reduced blood loss is necessary to medical management and outweighs the potential risks" and carefully monitor patients.

On October 25, 2007, the FDA issued a statement regarding the "Blood conservation using antifibrinolytics" (BART) randomized trial in a cardiac surgery population. The preliminary findings suggest that, compared to other antifibrinolytic drugs (epsilon-aminocaproic acid and tranexamic acid) aprotinin may increase the risk of death. On October 29, 2006 the Food and Drug Administration issued a warning that aprotinin may have serious kidney and cardiovascular toxicity. The producer, Bayer, reported to the FDA that additional observation studies showed that it may increase the chance for death, serious kidney damage, congestive heart failure and strokes. FDA warned clinicians to consider limiting use to those situations where the clinical benefit of reduced blood loss is essential to medical management and outweighs the potential risks. On November 5, 2007, Bayer announced that it was withdrawing Aprotinin because of a Canadian study that showed it increased the risk of death when used to prevent bleeding during heart surgery.

Two studies published in early 2008, both comparing aprotinin with aminocaproic acid, found that mortality was increased by 32 and 64%, respectively. One study found an increased risk in need for dialysis and revascularisation.

No cases of bovine spongiform encephalopathy transmission by aprotinin have been reported, although the drug was withdrawn in Italy due to fears of this.

== In vitro use ==
Small amounts of aprotinin can be added to tubes of drawn blood to enable laboratory measurement of certain rapidly degraded proteins such as glucagon.

In cell biology aprotinin is used as an enzyme inhibitor to prevent protein degradation during lysis or homogenization of cells and tissues.

Aprotinin can be labelled with fluorescein isothiocyanate. The conjugate retains its antiproteolytic and carbohydrate-binding properties and has been used as a fluorescent histochemical reagent for staining glycoconjugates (mucosubstances) that are rich in uronic or sialic acids.

== History ==
Initially named "kallikrein inactivator", aprotinin was first isolated from cow parotid glands in 1930. and independently as a trypsin inhibitor from bovine pancreas in 1936. It was purified from bovine lung in 1964. As it inhibits pancreatic enzymes, it was initially used in the treatment for acute pancreatitis, in which destruction of the gland by its own enzymes is thought to be part of the pathogenesis. Its use in major surgery commenced in the 1960s.

BPTI is one of the most thoroughly studied proteins in terms of structural biology, experimental and computational dynamics, mutagenesis, and folding pathway. It was one of the earliest protein crystal structures solved, in 1970 in the laboratory of Robert Huber, and it's substrate-like interaction mode deciphered in the context of the bovine trypsin complex in 1974. It later also became famous being the first protein to have its structure determined by NMR spectroscopy, in the laboratory of Kurt Wuthrich at the ETH in Zurich in the early 1980s.

Because it is a small, stable protein whose structure had been determined at high resolution by 1975, it was the first macromolecule of scientific interest to be simulated using molecular dynamics computation, in 1977 by J. Andrew McCammon and Bruce Gelin, in the Karplus group at Harvard. That study confirmed the then-surprising fact found in the NMR work that even well-packed aromatic sidechains in the interior of a stable protein can flip over rather rapidly (microsecond to millisecond time scale). Rate constants were determined by NMR for the hydrogen exchange of individual peptide NH groups along the chain, ranging from too fast to measure on the most exposed surface to many months for the most buried hydrogen-bonded groups in the center of the β sheet, and those values also correlate fairly well with degree of motion seen in the dynamics simulations.

BPTI was important in the development of knowledge about the process of protein folding, the self-assembly of a polypeptide chain into a specific arrangement in 3D. The problem of achieving the correct pairings among the 6 Cys sidechains was shown to be especially difficult for the two buried, close-together SS near the BPTI chain termini, requiring a non-native intermediate for folding the mature sequence in vitro (it was later discovered that the precursor sequence folds more easily in vivo). BPTI was the cover image on a protein folding compendium volume by Thomas Creighton in 1992.

== Current findings ==
One scientific study in rats reported that treatment with aprotinin prevents disruption of the blood–brain barrier during the C. neoformans infection. Another study in cell cultures suggests that the drug inhibits SARS-CoV-2 Replication.
