= Kobe Gakuin University =

Private co-educational university in Japan

Coordinates: 34°39′51″N 135°01′41″E

- 神戸学院大学
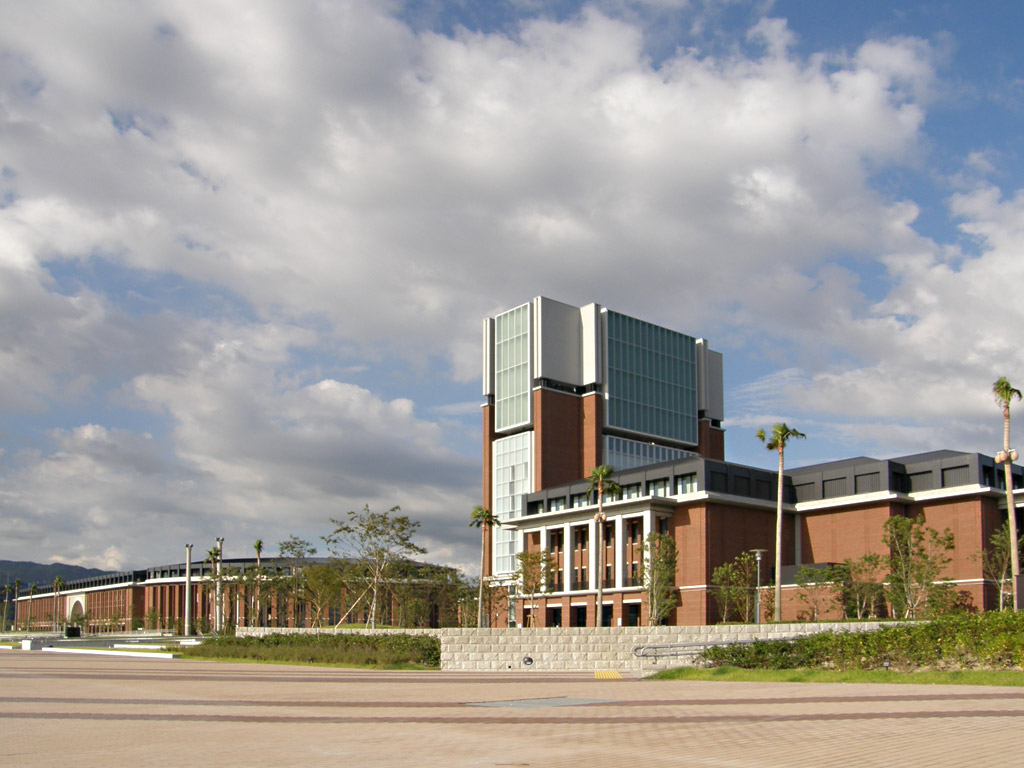
- Type: Private
- Established: 1966
- President: Masami Sato
- Academic staff: 9
- Administrative staff: 319
- Students: 10,609
- Undergraduates: 10,520
- Postgraduates: 70
- Doctoral students: 19
- Location: Kobe, Hyōgo, Japan
- Website: http://www.kobegakuin.ac.jp/

Kobe Gakuin University (神戸学院大学, Kōbe Gakuin Daigaku) is a private, co-educational university located on the western edge of the city of Kobe, in Hyōgo Prefecture in Japan. It was founded in 1966 and overlooks the city of Akashi, the Akashi Straits and the Akashi Kaikyo Bridge - the longest suspension bridge in the world. The university has three campuses in Kobe. These are located near Akashi, near Nagata and on Port Island.

== Brief Introduction ==
Kobe Gakuin University was founded in 1966 with Shigeki Mori as its first president. Initially offering a single course of study in the Faculty of Nutrition for 100 students, the university now contains nine faculties and seven graduate schools, and has expanded to two campuses. The largest private university integrating the cultural, social and natural studies in Kobe City, Kobe Gakuin University currently has a student body of 10,000 students, and is proud to have graduated over 80,000 students from its university graduate school courses.

== Educational and Research Activities ==
In addition to working to improve specialized education and research capabilities at the faculty level, Kobe Gakuin University, together with the Institute for Promotion of Higher Education, established in 2014, will pursue the further improvement of general education at the university level as well as the administration of an inter-faculty education program.

== International Activities ==
Ever since its founding in 1966, Kobe Gakuin University has been committed to promoting international exchange with the aim of developing human resources with an international perspective. To date, the university has established international partnership agreements with 29 institutions in eleven countries and has a solid track record in faculty interaction, student exchanges and sending students to study abroad, short-term overseas training and the sharing of scientific documentation, etc. Other international exchange programs include joint research with foreign researchers and symposia featuring prominent scientists and researchers as guests.

== Faculties ==
- Faculty of Law
- Faculty of Economics
- Faculty of Humanities
- Faculty of Nutrition
- Faculty of Pharmaceutical Sciences
- Faculty of Rehabilitation
- Faculty of Business Administration
- Faculty of Contemporary Social Studies
- Faculty of Global Communication
- Graduate School of Law
- Graduate School of Economics
- Graduate School of Humanities and Sciences
- Graduate School of Nutrition
- Graduate School of Pharmaceutical Sciences
- Graduate School of Food and Medicinal Sciences

== Notable faculty ==
- Utako Okamoto physician and discoverer of use of tranexamic acid.
