= CU-2010 and CU-2020 =

Synthetic compounds that act as serine protease inhibitors

CU-2010 and CU-2020 are synthetic compounds that act as serine protease inhibitors. These were developed in 2010 to replace the use of aprotinin during and after cardiac surgery, including surgeries with cardiopulmonary bypass which cause blood loss and hemorrhagic complications. CU-2010 and CU-2020 were developed to avoid many issues associated with the use of aprotinin, including the risk of an allergic reaction and infection. Since the isolation of aprotinin is expensive, a drug with a simpler synthesis was desired.

== Chemistry ==
CU-2010 has a molecular weight of 700 Da and binds to the active site of serine proteases, like a substrate, due to its peptide-like properties.

== Pharmacology ==
After intravenous infusion, CU-2010 is quickly cleared as it has a half-life of about 20 minutes (in rats and dogs). Polymerization and covalent attachment of polymer chains of polyethylene glycol (PEG) or pegylation results in the formation of CU-2020, which has a longer half-life of 45 minutes. The advantage of the short half-life of CU-2010 is that it allows it to work in an “on-off” mode, hence being able to adapt to the haemostatic situation of the moment.

CU-2010 and CU-2020 have the ability to inhibit plasmin to a similar extent as aprotinin, but they are 100,000 times better at inhibiting factor Xa and factor Xia. These inhibitory properties as well as their inhibition of plasma kallikrein and thrombin, reduces the production of thrombin and coagulation time. In vitro studies confirmed the fibrinolysis inhibition capacity of CU-2010 when present at concentrations between 100 and 1000 nM.

The prolongation of coagulation (or prothrombin time, PT) occurs following either tissue factor or contact-phase stimulation and is dose-dependent. CU-2010 acts as an effective contact-phase inhibitor at antifibrinolytic concentrations. Further, when CU-2010 and CU-2020 are continuously infused, the greater inhibition of factors Xa and XIa compared to that by aprotinin prevent early thrombosis, providing an anti-coagulatory effect in patients, and prolonging activated partial thromboplastin time (aPTT). Prolonged time for lysis further displays the anti-fibrinolytic characteristics of these drugs. Together, the anti-coagulatory and anti-fibrinolytic effects reduce the chance of thrombo-embolic complications.

CU-2010 and CU-2020 possess anti inflammatory effects due to their inhibition on plasma–kallikrein. CU-2010 and CU-2020 reduce leukocyte-endothelial interaction, migration of leukocytes, adhesion molecules expression, rate of apoptosis, inflammatory genes expression (especially TNF-α) and protein synthesis, all events which normally occur after myocardial ischemia/reperfusion. These anti-inflammatory effects of the serine protease inhibitors result in a reduced amount of free radicals and less lipid peroxidation with the amount of malonaldehyde in the heart tissue being reduced. However, the activation of neutrophils does not seem to be altered. CU-2010 and CU-2020 improve coronary endothelial function similarly to aprotinin. Unlike aprotinin, at high doses, their anti-inflammatory properties allow for the improvement in the recovery of contractility in the left ventricle after ischemic conditions, and increase the protection of the myocardium. Moreover, CU-2010 and CU-2020 do not compromise clot strength, and do not affect the function of vascular smooth muscle.
