= Hypodysfibrinogenemia =

- Other names: Congenital hypodysfibrinogenemia
- Specialty: Hematology
- Causes: Mutations in the gene for the fibrinogen alpha chain, fibrinogen beta chain, or fibrinogen gamma chain gene

Hypodysfibrinogenemia, also termed congenital hypodysfibrinogenemia, is a rare hereditary fibrinogen disorder cause by mutations in one or more of the genes that encode a factor critical for blood clotting, fibrinogen. These mutations result in the production and circulation at reduced levels of fibrinogen at least some of which is dysfunctional. Hypodysfibrinogenemia exhibits reduced penetrance, i.e. only some family members with the mutated gene develop symptoms.

The disorder is similar to a form of dysfibrinogenemia termed congenital dysfibrinogenemia. However, congenital dysfibrinogenemia differs from hypodysfibrinogenemia in four ways. Congenital dysfibrinogenemia involves: the circulation at normal levels of fibrinogen at least some of which is dysfunctional; a different set of causative gene mutations; a somewhat different mix of clinical symptoms; and a much lower rate of penetrance.

Hypodysfibrinogenemia causes episodes of pathological bleeding and thrombosis due not only to low levels of circulating fibrinogen but also to the dysfunction of a portion of the circulating fibrinogen. The disorder can lead to very significant bleeding during even minor surgical procedures and women afflicted with the disorder often suffer significant bleeding during and after giving child birth, higher rates of miscarriages, and menorrhagia, i.e. abnormally heavy bleeding during the menstrual period.

== Presentation ==
In a study of 32 individuals diagnosed with hypodysfibrinogenemia, 41% presented with episodic bleeding, 43% presented with episodic thrombosis, and 16% were asymptomatic, being detected by abnormal blood tests. Bleeding and thrombosis generally begin in adulthood with the average age at the time of presentation and diagnosis being 32 years. Bleeding is more frequent and severe in women of child-bearing age; these women may suffer miscarriages, menometrorrhagia, and excessive bleeding during child birth and/or the postpartum period. Excessive bleeding following major or minor surgery, including dental extractions, occurs in both females and males with the disorder. Thrombotic complications of the disorder are often (≈50%) recurrent and can involve central and peripheral arteries, deep and superficial veins. Thrombotic events may be serious and involve occlusion of a cerebral artery leading to stroke, splanchnic venous thrombosis, and pulmonary thrombosis presumptively secondary to deep vein thrombosis.

== Fibrinogen ==
Circulating fibrinogen is a glycoprotein made of two trimers each of which is composed of three polypeptide chains, Aα (also termed α) encoded by the FGA gene, Bβ (also termed β) encoded by the FGB gene, and γ encoded by the FGG gene. All three genes are located on the long or "q" arm of human chromosome 4 (at positions 4q31.3, 4q31.3, and 4q32.1, respectively) and are the sites where mutations occur that code for a dysfunctional fibrinogen and/or reduced fibrinogen levels which are the cause of congenital hypodysfibrinogenemia.

== Pathophysiology ==
Congenital hypodysfibrinogenemia is inherited as an autosomal dominant disorder caused by at least 32 different types of single mutations. Ten of these mutations are in the fibrinogen alpha chain gene (also termed the FGA gene), 5 in the fibrinogen beta chain gene (also termed the FGB gene), and 17 in the fibrinogen gamma chain gene (also termed the FGG gen). The mutations are mainly missense mutations with nonsense and Frameshift mutations each occurring in 12.5% of cases. The causes of two fibrinogen abnormalities that characterize hypodysfibrinogenemia, i.e. circulation at reduced levels of fibrinogen at least some of which is dysfunctional, reflect different molecular mechanisms:

1. A heterozygous mutation in one of the two copies of either the FGA, FGB, or FGG gene leads to production of a fibrinogen that is both dysfunctional and poorly secreted into the blood stream, e.g. fibrinogen Vlissingen, fibrinogen Philadelphia, and fibrinogen Freiburg.
2. A homozygous mutation in both copies of one of the cited genes leads to production of a fibrinogen that is both dysfunctional and poorly secreted into the blood stream, e.g. fibrinogen Otago, fibrinogen Marburg, and fibrinogen Sfax.
3. Two different mutations (see Compound heterozygosity) occur in each of the two copies of one of the cited genes, with one mutation coding for reduced formation of a functionally normal circulating fibrinogen and the second mutation coding for the circulation of a dysfunctional fibrinogen, e.g. fibrinogen Leipzig.
4. Two different mutations occur in one copy of the cited genes, with one mutation causing hypofibrinogenemia and the other mutation coding for a dysfunctional fibrinogen, e.g. fibrinogen Keokuk.

The following Table adds further information on the just cited examples of hypodysfibrinogenemias. The Table gives: a) each mutated protein's trivial name; b) the gene mutated (i.e. FGA, FGB, or FGG), its mutation site (i.e. numbered nucleotide in the cloned gene), and name of the nucleotides (i.e. C, T, A, G) at these sites before>after the mutation; c) the name of the altered fibrinogen peptide (Aα, Bβ, or λ) and the amino acids (using standard abbreviations) occurring before-after the mutation at the numbered amino acid(s) sites in the circulating mutated fibrinogen; d) the pathophysiology for the mutated fibrinogen's misfunction(s); and e) the clinical consequence(s) of the mutation. Unless noted as a deletion (del) or frame shift (fs), all mutations are missense or nonsense mutations. A nonsense mutation causing a premature stop codon and thereby a shorten polypeptide chain is notated by an X (PSC) after the altered amino acid codon.

Trivial name	Gene: mutation	Polypeptide chain: mutation	Pathophysiology	Clinical disorder
fibrinogen Otago	FGA: c.858_859incC	Aα: Arg268Gln followed by fs	impaired secretion; defective polymerization	post-surgical and post-partum bleeding, recurrent miscarriages
fibrinogen Marburg	FGA: c.1438A>T	Aα: Lys461X (PSC)	defective polymerization	post-partum bleeding, recurrent venous thrombosis
fibrinogen Keokuk	FGA: c.510 +1 G>T; FGA c.1039C>T (PSC)	Aα: splice mutation; Aα: Gln321X (PSC)	impaired fibrinogen assembly, poor fibrin clot lysis, defective polymerization	recurrent venous and arterial thromboses
fibrinogen Sfax	FGB: c.679T>C	Bβ: Cys197Arg	defective aggregation of fibrin	post-surgical and postpartum bleeding, metrorrhagia during pregnancy
fibrinogen Vlissingen	FGG: c.1033_1038del	γ: delAsn319-Asp-320	impaired secretion, defective calcium binding, defective polymerization	venous thrombosis
fibrinogen Philadelphia	FGG: c.1210T>C	γ: Ser378Pro	impaired assembly of intracelllar fibrinogen, defective polymerization	post-surgical, postpartum, and post-trauma bleeding
fibrinogen Freiburg	FGG: c.103C>T	γ: Arg16Cys	impaired assembly of intracelllar fibrinogen, defective polymerization	recurrent venous and arterial thromboses
fibrinogen Leipzig II	FGG: c.323C>G and FGG c.1129G>A	γ: Ala108Gly and λ: Gly377Ser	impaired assembly of intracelllar fibrinogen, defective polymerization	recurrent venous and arterial thromboses

== Diagnosis ==
Hypodysfibrinogenemia is usually diagnosed in individuals who: have a history of abnormal bleeding or thrombosis or are a close blood relative of such an individual. Initial laboratory findings include a decrease in serum fibrinogen mass levels as measured by immunoassay plus a reduction in inducible blood clot formation so that the ratio of functionally-detected fibrinogen mass (i.e. detected in induced clots) to immunoassay-detected fibrinogen mass is abnormally low, i.e. <0.7. This contrast with individuals with congenital dysfibrinogenemia who exhibit normal levels of fibrinogen as measured by immunoassay but low functionally-detected to immunoassay-detected fibrinogen mass ratios, i.e. <0.7. Where available, specialized laboratories can conduct studies to define the exact gene mutation(s) and fibrinogen abnormalities underlying the disorder.

== Treatment ==
Blood relatives of the proband case should be evaluated for the presence of hypodysfibrinogenemia. Individuals with the disorder need to be advised on its inheritance, complications, and preventative measures that can be taken to avoid bleeding and/or thrombosis. Since >80% of individuals may develop bleeding or thrombosis complications of the disorder, asymptomatic individuals diagnosed with hydposyfibrinogenemia are best handled at a specialized center in order to benefit from multidisciplinary management.

Measures to prevent and/or treat complications of hypodysfibrinogenemia should be tailored to the personal and family history of the individual by a specialized center. Individuals with a personal or family history of bleeding are considered to be of low risk of bleeding when their functional fibrinogen levels are >1 gram/liter for major surgery, >0.5 gram/liter for minor surgery, >0.5 to 1-2 gram/liter for spontaneous bleeding (depending on its severity), >0.5 to > 1 gram/liter for the first two trimesters of pregnancy, and >1 to <2 gram/liter for the last trimester of pregnancy and postpartum period. Functional fibrinogen below these levels should be treated preferably with fibrinogen concentrate or if not available, fibrinogen-rich cryoprecipitate or plasma to attain low risk levels of functional fibrinogen. Antifibrinolytic drugs such as tranexamic acid or (ε-aminocaproic acid) may be considered as an alternative preventative or therapeutic treatments in cases of minor surgery, dental extractions, mucosal bleeding, or other episodes of mild bleeding. In individuals with a personal or family history of thrombosis, should be considered for long-term anticoagulation drugs such as low molecular weight heparin, coumadin, or rivaroxaban.
