= Cetyl tranexamate mesylate =

Molecule derived from tranexamic acid

Names
- IUPAC name [(1r,4r)‐4‐[(Hexadecyloxy)carbonyl]cyclohexyl]methanaminium mesylate

Identifiers
3D model (JSmol)	Interactive image
- InChI: InChI=1S/C24H47NO2.CH4O3S/c1-2-3-4-5-6-7-8-9-10-11-12-13-14-15-20-27-24(26)23-18-16-22(21-25)17-19-23;1-5(2,3)4/h22-23H,2-21,25H2,1H3;1H3,(H,2,3,4)/t22-,23-; Key: YSNOYWYRZPPFLQ-HFSDZXIBSA-N
- SMILES: CS([O-])(=O)=O.CCCCCCCCCCCCCCCCOC(=O)[C@H]1CC[C@H](C[NH3+])CC1

Properties
Chemical formula	C_{25}H_{51}NO_{5}S
Molar mass	477.75 g·mol^{−1}
- Except where otherwise noted, data are given for materials in their standard state (at 25 °C [77 °F], 100 kPa). Infobox references

Cetyl tranexamate mesylate (sold under the trade name TXVector) is a skin-permeable derivative of tranexamic acid for use in cosmetic formulations. Its primary use is in skincare products aimed at enhancing appearance by targeting hyperpigmentation, uneven skin tone, inflammation, dark spots, UV induced erythema, acne scars, and overall skin clarity.

== Structure ==
Cetyl tranexamate mesylate is a lipophilic ester and salt of the cyclic amino acid tranexamic acid. By esterification of the carboxylic acid group on tranexamic acid, the molecule loses its zwitterionic structure, becomes positively charged with enhanced skin permeability. Its lipophilic character and positive charge provide additional cosmetic benefits such as skin moisturization and powder-like feel.

One unique aspect of cetyl tranexamate mesylate is that it is cationic and has cationic emulsification capability. Therefore it is always formulated into cationic emulsions, which in some cases to be superior to anionic emulsions for skin health and moisturization.

== Mechanism of action ==
Cetyl tranexamate mesylate is thought to act on the inflammatory pathway, reducing the melanogenesis and hyperpigmentation that is initiated by UV or acne inflammation. It differs from other hyperpigmentation actives, such as hydroquinone and kojic acid, which are toxic to melanocytes and thus lighten or bleach all skin to which they are applied. Cetyl tranexamate mesylate's selective targeting of inflamed melanin production, such as post-inflammatory hyperpigmentation (PIH) and acne-induced hyperpigmentation (AIH), may explain its popularity with users having dark skin tone.

For application on skin, cetyl tranexamate mesylate is substantially more bioavailable than unmodified tranexamic acid. The former permeates faster and diffuses to deeper layers of the skin, reaching live cells of the stratum granulosum, whereas standard tranexamic acid does not.

== Safety and regulation ==
Cetyl tranexamate mesylate is non-irritating and non-sensitizing in human studies. It is structural analogous to other lipophilic esters of amino acids which are readily biodegradable and non-toxic to the aquatic environment. Cetyl tranexamate mesylate is not on any country negative list for cosmetic products, though it is not yet approved as a skin brightening active under the China cosmetics regulation (CSAR).
