= Fibrinolysis syndrome =

- Other names: Defibrinating syndrome

Fibrinolysis syndrome is characterized by an acute hemorrhagic state brought about by inability of the blood to clot, with massive hemorrhages into the skin producing blackish, purplish swellings and sloughing.

== Symptoms ==
Hemorrhages (this includes severe bleeding of any particular area. Be it: nasal, rectal, oral, it also includes bleeding from scrapes, cuts, bruises (big bruises that do not disappear in the first two to three days).

== Cause ==
The cause for Fibrinolysis syndrome, is the inability of the body to produce blood-coagulates to stop bleeding. What causes the body to not produce blood-coagulates are the low levels of fibrin, or therefore non-existent fibrin.

== See also ==
- Skin lesion
- Hemorrhage
- Fibrin
