= Familial renal amyloidosis =

- Other names: Familial visceral amyloidosis, hereditary amyloid nephropathy
- This condition is inherited in an autosomal dominant manner
- Specialty: Nephrology

Familial renal amyloidosis is a form of amyloidosis primarily presenting in the kidney.

It is associated most commonly with congenital mutations in the fibrinogen alpha chain and classified as a dysfibrinogenemia (see Hereditary Fibrinogen Aα-Chain Amyloidosis). and, less commonly, with congenital mutations in apolipoprotein A1 and lysozyme.

It is also known as "Ostertag" type, after B. Ostertag, who characterized it in 1932 and 1950.
