= Dysfibrinogenemia =

- Other names: Dysfibrinogenemia, familial

The dysfibrinogenemias consist of three types of fibrinogen disorders in which a critical blood clotting factor, fibrinogen, circulates at normal levels but is dysfunctional. Congenital dysfibrinogenemia is an inherited disorder in which one of the parental genes produces an abnormal fibrinogen. This fibrinogen interferes with normal blood clotting and/or lysis of blood clots. The condition therefore may cause pathological bleeding and/or thrombosis. Acquired dysfibrinogenemia is a non-hereditary disorder in which fibrinogen is dysfunctional due to the presence of liver disease, autoimmune disease, a plasma cell dyscrasias, or certain cancers. It is associated primarily with pathological bleeding. Hereditary fibrinogen Aα-Chain amyloidosis is a sub-category of congenital dysfibrinogenemia in which the dysfunctional fibrinogen does not cause bleeding or thrombosis but rather gradually accumulates in, and disrupts the function of, the kidney.

Congenital dysfibrinogenemia is the most common of these three disorders. Some 100 different genetic mutations occurring in more than 400 families have been found to cause it. All of these mutations as well as those causing hereditary fibrinogen Aα-Chain amyloidosis exhibit partial penetrance, i.e. only some family members with one of these mutant genes develop dysfibrinogenemia-related symptoms. While both of these congenital disorders as well as acquired dysfibrinogenemia are considered very rare, it is estimated that ~0.8% of individuals with venous thrombosis have either a congenital or acquired dysfibrinogenemia. Hence, the dysfibrinogenemia disorders may be highly under-diagnosed conditions due to isolated thrombotic events that are not appreciated as reflecting an underlying fibrinogen disorder.

Congenital dysfibrinogenemia is distinguished from a similar inherited disorder, congenital hypodysfibrinogenemia. Both disorders involve the circulation of dysfunctional fibrinogen but in congenital hypodysfibrinogenemia plasma fibrinogen levels are low while in congenital dysfibrinogenemia they are normal. Furthermore, the two disorders involve different gene mutations and inheritance patterns as well as somewhat different symptoms.

== Fibrinogen ==
Fibrinogen is a glycoprotein made and secreted into the blood primarily by liver hepatocyte cells. Endothelium cells also make what appears to be small amounts of fibrinogen but this fibrinogen has not been fully characterized; blood platelets and their precursors, bone marrow megakaryocytes, although once thought to make fibrinogen, are now known to take up and store but not make the glycoprotein. The final secreted, hepatocyte-derived glycoprotein is made of two trimers each of which is composed of three polypeptide chains, Aα (also termed α) encoded by the FGA gene, Bβ (also termed β) encoded by the FGB gene, and γ encoded by the FGG gene. All three genes are located on the long (i.e. "p") arm of human chromosome 4 (at positions 4q31.3, 4q31.3, and 4q32.1, respectively) and may contain mutations that are the cause of congenital dysfibrinogenemia. The heximer is assembled as a protein in the endoplasmic reticulum of hepatocytes and then transferred to the Golgi where Polysaccharides (i.e. complex sugars) and sialic acid are added by respective glycosylation and sialylation enzyme pathways thereby converting the heximer to a functional fibrinogen glycoprotein. The final circulating glycoprotein (notated as (AαBβγ)_{2}, (αβγ)_{2}, Aα_{2}Bβ_{2}γ_{2}, or α_{2}β_{2}γ_{2}) is arranged as a long flexible rod with nodules at both ends termed D domains and central nodule termed the E domain.

The normal process of blood clot formation involves the coordinated operation of two separate pathways that feed into a final common pathway: 1) primary hemostasis, i.e. the adhesion, activation, and aggregation of circulating blood platelets at sites of vascular injury and 2) secondary hemostasis, i.e. cleavage of the Aα and Bβ chains of fibrinogen by thrombin to form individual fibrin strands plus the respective fibrinopeptides A and B formed from this cleavage. In the final common pathway fibrin is cross-linked by activated clotting factor XIII (termed factor XIIIa) to form mature gel-like fibrin clots. Subsequent fibrinolysis pathways act to limit clot formation and dissolve clots no longer needed. Fibrinogen and its Aα fibrin chain have several functions in this process:

- Blood clotting: fibrinogen concentration is the rate-limiting factor in blood clot formation and along with blood platelets is critical to this formation (see Coagulation).
- Platelet aggregation: fibrinogen promotes platelet aggregation by cross-linking platelet Glycoprotein IIb/IIIa receptors and thereby promotes blood clot formation through the primary hemostasis pathway.
- Blood clot lysis: The Aα fibrin chain formed from fibrinogen binds tissue plasminogen activator, an agent that breaks down blood clots to participate thereby in promoting fibrinolysis.

Based on these fibrinogen functions, a fibrinogen mutation may act either to inhibit or promote blood clot formation and/or lysis to thereby produce in individuals a diathesis to develop pathological bleeding, thrombosis, or both conditions.

== Congenital dysfibrinogenemia ==
=== Presentation ===
Many cases of congenital dysfibrinogenemia are asymptomatic. Since manifestations of the disorder generally occur in early adulthood or middle-age, younger individuals with a gene mutation causing it may not have had time to develop symptoms while previously asymptomatic individuals of advanced age with such a mutation are unlikely to develop symptoms. Bleeding episodes in most cases of this disorder are mild and commonly involve easy bruising and menorrhagia. Less common manifestations of bleeding may be severe or even life-threatening; these include excessive bleeding after tooth extraction, surgery, vaginal birth, and miscarriage. Rarely, these individuals may suffer hemarthrosis or cerebral hemorrhage. In one study of 37 individuals >50 years old afflicted with this disorder, 19% had a history of thrombosis. Thrombotic complications occur in both arteries and veins and include transient ischemic attack, ischemic stroke, myocardial infarction, retinal artery thrombosis, peripheral artery thrombosis, and deep vein thrombosis. In one series of 33 individuals with a history of thrombosis due to congenital dysfibrinogenemia, five developed chronic pulmonary hypertension due to ongoing pulmonary embolism probably stemming from deep vein thrombosis. About 26% of individuals with the disorder suffer both bleeding and thrombosis complications.

=== Pathophysiology ===
Congenital dysfibrinogenemia is most often caused by a single autosomal dominant missense mutation in the Aα, Bβ, or γ gene; rarely, it is caused by a homozygous or compound heterozygous missense mutation, a deletion, frameshift mutation, insert mutation, or splice site mutation in one of these genes. The most frequent sites for these mutations code for the N-terminus of the Aα chain or the C-terminus of the γ chain that lead to defective assembly of fibrin in early clot formation and thereby a bleeding predisposition. Two particular missense mutations represent the majority (74% in one study of 101 individuals) of all mutations associated with dysfibrinogenemia and therefore represent prime sites to examine in the initial testing of individuals having a congenital dysfibrinogenmia bleeding disorder. These mutations alter the codon coded for the amino acid arginine at either the 35th position of FGA (termed Arg35; see fibrinogen Metz1 and fibrinogen Bicetre in the Table below) and or the 301st position of FGG (termed Arg301; see fibrinogen Baltimore IV in the Table below).

The following Table lists examples of mutations causing congenital dysfibrinogenemias. It gives: a) the mutated protein's trivial name; b) the gene mutated (i.e. FGA, FGB, or FGG), its mutation site (i.e. numbered nucleotide in the cloned gene), and the names of the nucleotides (i.e. C, T, A, G) at these sites before>after the mutation; c) the altered fibrinogen peptide (Aα, Bβ, or λ) and the amino acids (using standard abbreviations) found in the normal-mutated circulating fibrinogen; d) the cause of the mutated fibrinogen's misfunction(s); e) the clinical consequence(s) of the mutation; and f) comments. Unless noted as a deletion (del), frame shift (fs), or homozygous mutation, all mutations are heterozygous, missense mutations.

| Trivial name | Gene: site of mutation | Protein chain: site mutation | Pathophysiology | Clinical disorder | Comment |
|---|---|---|---|---|---|
| fibrinogen Detroit | FGA: c.114G>C/T | Aα: Arg19Ser | abnormal Polymerization | bleeding | relatively rare; first description of congenital dysfibrinogenmia |
| fibrinogen Metz1 | FGA: c.103C>T | Aα: Arg35Cys | delayed release of fibrinopeptide A | bleeding | relatively common |
| fibrinogen Bicetrel | FGA: c.104C>G | Aα: Arg35His | delayed release of fibrinopeptide A | bleeding | relatively common |
| fibrinogen Perth | FGA: c.1541delC | Aα: Pro495Leufs | thin clot, increased clot strength, impaired plasmin generation | bleeding and thrombosis | relatively rare |
| fibrinogen Naples | FGB: c.292G>A | Bβ: Ala68thr | defective thrombin binding | thrombosis | relatively rare; homozygous |
| fibrinogen BaltimoreIV | FGG: c.901C>T | λ: Arg301Cys | impaired fiber interactions | thrombosis | relatively common |
| fibrinogen Vlissingen | FGG: c.1033_1038del | λ: del Asn319-Asp320 | impaired fiber interactions | thrombosis | relatively rare; nucleotides 1033-1038 and amino acids 319-320 deleted |
| fibrinogen BarccelonaIV | FGG: c.902G>A | λ: Arg301His | impaired fiber interactions | thrombosis | relatively common |

=== Diagnosis ===
The diagnosis of congenital dysfibrinogenmia is made by clinical laboratory studies that find normal levels of plasma fibrinogen but significant excess in the amount of immunologically detected compared to functionally detected (i.e. able to be clotted) fibrinogen. The ratio of functionally-detected to immunologically detected fibrinogen masses in these cases is <0.7. Partial thromboplastin time, activated partial thromboplastin time, thrombin time, and reptilase time tests are usually prolonged regardless of history of bleeding or thrombosis. Where available, laboratory analyses of the fibrinogen genes and peptide chains solidify the diagnosis. Initial examination of these genes or protein chains should search specifically for "hot spot" mutations, i.e. the most common mutations (see Pathophysiology section) that comprise the large bulk of mutations in the disorder. In cases of dysfibrinogenemia in which acquired disease is suspected, diagnosis requires a proper diagnosis of the presence of a causable disease.

Congenital dysfibrinogenmia is initially distinguished form congenital hypodysfibrinogenemia by the finding of normal immunologically-detected levels of fibrinogen in congenital dysfibrinogenemia and sub-normal levels of immunologically-detected fibrinogen in congenital hypodysfibrinogenemia. Both disorders exhibit mass ratios of functionally-detected to immunologically-detected fibrinogen that are below <0.7. Genetic and protein analyses can definitively differentiate the two disorders.

=== Treatment ===
In a study of 189 individuals diagnosed with congenital dysfibrinogenemia, ~33% were asymptomatic, ~47% experienced episodic bleeding, and ~20% experienced episodic thromboses. Due to the rareness of this disorder, treatment of individuals with these presentations are based primarily on case reports, guidelines set by the United Kingdom, and expert opinions rather than controlled clinical studies.

==== Asymptomatic individuals ====
Treatment of asymptomatic congenital dysfibrinogenemia depends in part on the expectations of developing bleeding and/or thrombotic complications as estimated based on the history of family members with the disorder and, where available, determination of the exact mutation causing the disorder plus the propensity of the particular mutation type to develop these complications. In general, individuals with this disorder require regular follow-up and multidiscipline management prior to surgery, pregnancy, and giving childbirth. Women with the disorder appear to have an increased rate of miscarriages and all individuals with fibrinogen activity in clotting tests below 0.5 grams/liter are prone to bleeding and spontaneous abortions. Women with multiple miscarriages and individuals with excessively low fibrinogen activity levels should be considered for prophylaxis therapy with fibrinogen replacement during pregnancy, delivery, and/or surgery.

==== Symptomatic individuals ====
Individuals experiencing episodic bleeding as a result of congenital dysfibrinogenemia should be treated at a center specialized in treating hemophilia. They should avoid all medications that interfere with normal platelet function. During bleeding episodes, treatment with fibrinogen concentrates or in emergencies or when these concentrates are unavailable, infusions of fresh frozen plasma and/or cryoprecipitate (a fibrinogen-rich plasma fraction) to maintain fibrinogen activity levels >1 gram/liter. Tranexamic acid or fibrinogen concentrates are recommended for prophylactic treatment prior to minor surgery while fibrinogen concentrates are recommended prior to major surgery with fibrinogen concentrates usage seeking to maintain fibrinogen activity levels at >1 gram/liter. Women undergoing vaginal or Cesarean child birth should be treated at a hemophilia center with fibrinogen concentrates to maintain fibrinogen activity levels at 1.5 gram/liter. The latter individuals require careful observation for bleeding during their post-partum periods.

Individuals experiencing episodic thrombosis as a result of congenital dysfibrinogenemia should also be treated at a center specialized in treating hemophilia using antithrombotic agents. They should be instructed on antithrombotic behavioral methods fur use in high risk situations such as long car rides and air flights. Venous thrombosis should be treated with low molecular weight heparin for a period that depends on personal and family history of thrombosis events. Prophylactic treatment prior to minor surgery should avoid fibrinogen supplementation and use prophylactic anticoagulation measures; prior to major surgery, fibrinogen supplementation should be used only if serious bleeding occurs; otherwise, prophylactic anticoagulation measures are recommended.

== Hereditary fibrinogen Aα-Chain amyloidosis ==
=== Presentation ===
Individuals with hereditary fibrinogen Aα-chain amyloidosis present with evidence ranging from asymptomatic proteinuria to progressive renal impairment and end-stage kidney disease. They do not evidence pathological bleeding or thrombosis and their amyloidosis is non-systemic in that it is restricted to the kidney. In a report on 474 patients with renal amyloidosis, hereditary fibrinogen Aα chain disease represented only 1.3% of all cases whereas aberrant immunoglobulin-induced renal amyloidosis (e.g. AL amyloidosis) represented 86% of the cases). Hereditary fibrinogen Aα-Chain amyloidosis is, however, the most common form of familial renal amyloidosis.

=== Pathophysiology ===
Certain mutations in the fibrinogen Aα-chain gene cause a form of familial renal amyloidosis termed hereditary fibrinogen Aα-Chain amyloidosis. The disorder is due to autosomal dominant inheritance of Aα chain mutations the most common of which is hemoglobin Indianapolis, a heterozygous missense (c.1718G>T: Arg554Leu) mutation. Other missense mutations causing this disorder are unnamed; they include 1634A>T: Glu526Val; c.1670C>A: Thr538lys; c.1676A.T:Glu540Val; and c1712C>A:Pro552His. A deletion mutation causing a frameshift viz., c.1622delT: Thr525Leu, is also a cause of the disorder. The fibrinogen bearing these mutant Aα-chains is secreted into the circulation and gradually accumulates in, and causes significant injury to, the kidney. The mutant fibrinogen does not appear to accumulate in, or injure, extra-renal tissues.

=== Diagnosis ===
The diagnosis of this disorder depends on demonstrating: 1) a dysfunctional plasma fibrinogen, i.e. significantly less functionally-detected compared to immunologically-detected fibrinogen; b) presence of signs and/or symptoms of kidney disease; and c) histological evidence of often massive obliteration of renal glomeruli by amyloid as detected by Congo red staining. There also should be no evidence for systemic amyloidosis. Specialized centers use immunological and genetic studies to define the nature of the renal amyloid deposits, the presence of FGA gene mutations, and the occurrence of these mutations in family members. The disorder exhibits a highly variable penetrance among family members. Hereditary fibrinogen Aα-Chain amyloidosis shows variable penetrance among family members, a distinctive histological appearance, proteinuria, progressive renal impairment, and markedly better survival rates than other forms of systemic renal amyloidosis.

=== Treatment ===
Treatment of hereditary fibrinogen Aα-Chain amyloidosis has relied on chronic maintenance hemodialysis and, where possible, kidney transplantation. While recurrence of amyloidosis in the transplanted kidney occurs and is to be expected, transplant survival rates for this form of amyloidosis are significantly better than those for transplants in other forms of systemic renal amyloidosis. Relatively healthy individuals with hereditary fibrinogen Aα-Chain-related renal amyloidosis may be considered for kidney and liver bi-transplantation with the expectation that survival of the transplanted kidney will be prolonged by replacing the fibrinogen Aα-Chain-producing liver with a non-diseased donor liver.

== Acquired dysfibrinogenemia ==
=== Presentation ===
Acquired dysfibrinogenemia commonly present with signs, symptoms, and/or prior diagnoses of the underlying causative disease or drug intake in an individual with an otherwise unexplained bleeding tendency or episode. Bleeding appears to be more prominent in acquired compared to congenital dysfibrinogenemia; pathological thrombosis, while potentially occurring in these individuals as a complication of their underlying disease, is an uncommon feature of the acquired disorder.

=== Pathophysiology ===
Acquired dysfibrinogenemia occurs as a known or presumed consequence of an underlying disease which directly or indirectly interferes with the clotting function of fibrinogen. Individuals with acquired dysfibrinogenemias have a greater tendency for bleeding complications than those with congenital fibrinogenemia. The following Table gives some abnormalities, causes, and apparent pathophysiology along with some comments on examples of acquired dysfibrinogenemia.

| Abnormality | Cause | Pathophysiology | Comment |
|---|---|---|---|
| incorrect post-translational modification of fibrinogen | severe liver disease | abnormal fibrinogen sialylation | most common cause of acquired dysfibrinogenemia |
| monoclonal antibody | plasma cell dyscrasias such as multiple myeloma and MGUS | monoclonal antibody interferes with clotting | uncommon |
| polyclonal antibody | autoimmune diseases such as systemic lupus erythematosus, rheumatoid arthritis, ulcerative colitis | polyclonal antibody interferes with clotting | uncommon |
| production of abnormal fibrinogen by cancer | cervical cancer of epithelium, renal cell carcinoma, others | paraneoplastic effect of cancer | extremely rare |
| Drug effect | mithramycin, isoniazid, direct thrombin inhibitors (e.g. heparin, dabigatran, bivalirudin, argatroban) | unclear | extremely rare case reports |

=== Diagnosis ===
Diagnosis of acquired dysfibrinogenemia uses the same laboratory tests that are used for congenital dysfibrinogenemia plus evidence for an underlying causative disease.

=== Treatment ===
Treatment of acquired dysfibrinogenemia follows the guidelines recommended for congenital dysfibrinogenemia. In addition, treatment of any disease thought to be responsible for the dysfibrinogenemia might be useful. For example, therapeutic plasma exchange and chemotherapy to reduce monoclonal antibody levels has been used successfully to reverse otherwise uncontrollable bleeding in cases of multiple myeloma-associated dysfibrinogenemia.
