= Thrombin time =

Medical diagnostic test

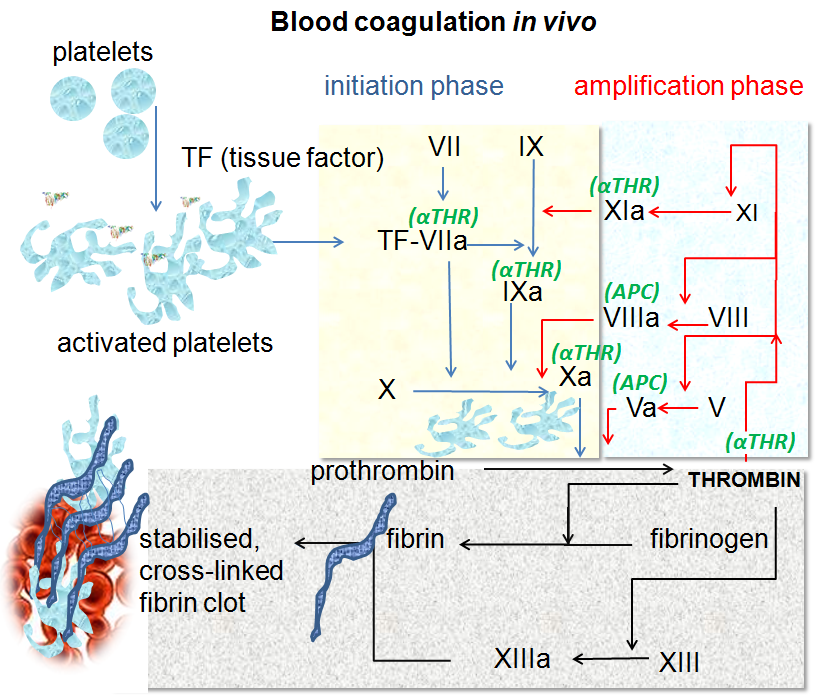
- Blood coagulation pathways in vivo showing the central role played by thrombin
- Synonyms: Thrombin clotting time (TCT)
- MeSH: D013918

The thrombin time (TT), also known as the thrombin clotting time (TCT), is a blood test that measures the time it takes for a clot to form in the plasma of a blood sample containing anticoagulant, after an excess of thrombin has been added. It is used to diagnose blood coagulation disorders and to assess the effectiveness of fibrinolytic therapy. This test is repeated with pooled plasma from normal patients. The difference in time between the test and the 'normal' indicates an abnormality in the conversion of fibrinogen (a soluble protein) to fibrin, an insoluble protein.

The thrombin time compares the rate of clot formation to that of a sample of normal pooled plasma. Thrombin is added to the samples of plasma. If the time it takes for the plasma to clot is prolonged, a quantitative (fibrinogen deficiency) or qualitative (dysfunctional fibrinogen) defect is present. In blood samples suspected to contain heparin, a substance derived from snake venom called batroxobin (formerly reptilase) is used for comparison to thrombin time. Batroxobin has a similar action to thrombin but unlike thrombin it is not inhibited by heparin, so reptilase time and thrombin time can be used concurrently to distinguish anticoagulant effect from hypofibrinogenemia or dysfibrinogenemia.

Normal values for thrombin time may be 12 to 14 seconds, but the test has significant reagent variability. If batroxobin is used, the time should be between 15 and 20 seconds. Thrombin time can be prolonged by heparin, fibrin degradation products, and fibrinogen deficiency or abnormality. Thrombin time is not affected by anti-Xa anticoagulants such as rivaroxaban or apixaban, but is very sensitive to direct thrombin inhibitors including dabigatran, argatroban, and bivalirudin.

== Test procedure ==
After separating the plasma from the whole blood by centrifugation, bovine thrombin is added to the sample of plasma. Clot formation is detected optically or mechanically by a coagulation instrument. The time between the addition of the thrombin and the clot formation is recorded as the thrombin clotting time.

== Specimen requirements ==
Whole blood is taken with either citrate or oxalate additive (if using the vacutainer system, this is a light blue top tube). As with other coagulation assays, the tube must not be over- or under-filled in order to ensure the correct anticoagulant-to-blood ratio: one part anticoagulant per nine parts blood.

== Reference ranges ==
The reference ranges of the thrombin clotting time is generally <22 seconds, and often from 14 to 16 seconds. Laboratories usually calculate their own ranges, based on the method used and the results obtained from healthy individuals from the local population. Variability arises from differences in thrombin concentration, dilution of plasma, presence and/or concentration of calcium ions, as well as the influence of analyser type. TT may also be sensitive to citrate pH. Separate ranges are used for infants.

== Limitations ==
Blood samples that are more than eight hours old can give inaccurate results when tested.

== See also ==
- Coagulation cascade
- Partial thromboplastin time (PTT), or activated partial thromboplastin time (aPTT or APTT)
- Prothrombin time (PT)
