= Aminocaproic acid =

Chemical compound

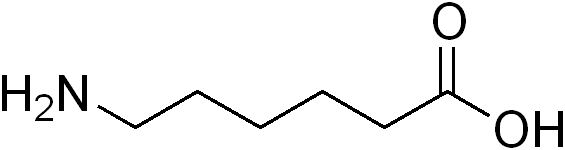
- Skeletal formula

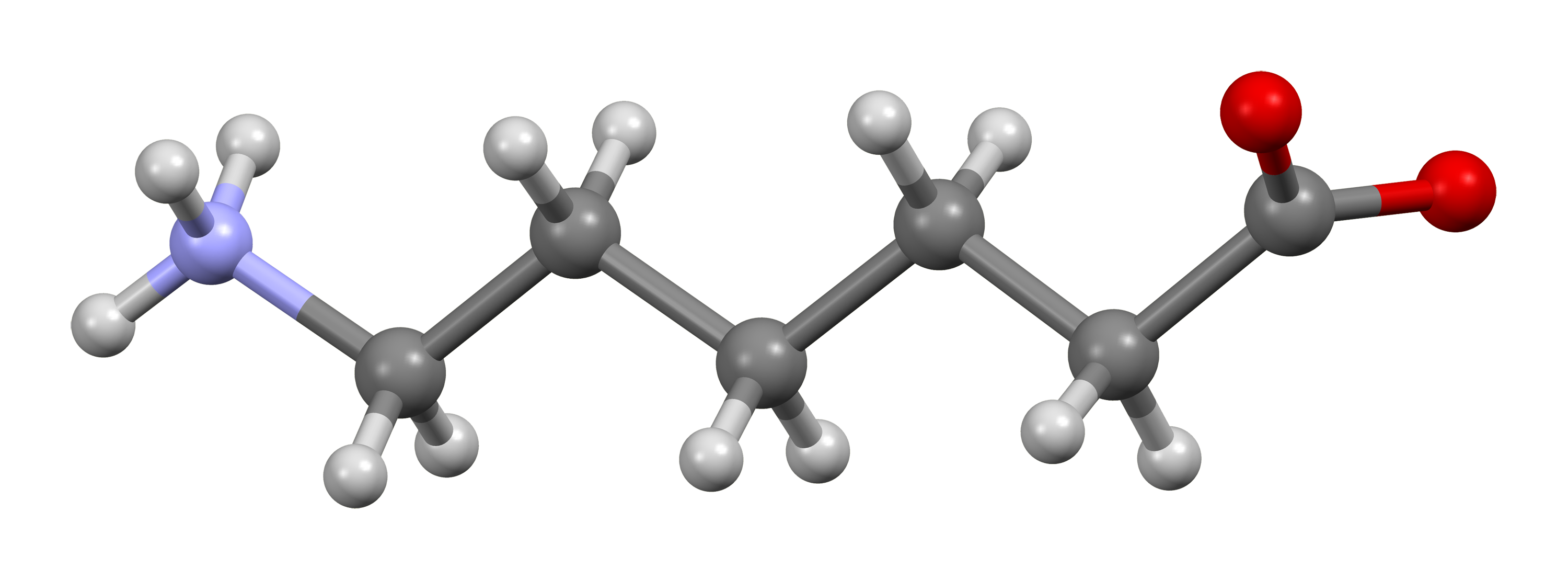
- Ball-and-stick model of the zwitterionic form of the molecule found in the crystal structure

Clinical data
- Trade names: Amicar
- AHFS/Drugs.com: Monograph
- MedlinePlus: a608023
- License data: US DailyMed: Aminocaproic_acid
- Routes of administration: By mouth
- ATC code: B02AA01 (WHO)

Legal status
- Legal status: US: ℞-only; In general: ℞ (Prescription only)

Pharmacokinetic data
- Metabolism: Kidney
- Elimination half-life: 2 hours

Identifiers
- IUPAC name: 6-aminohexanoic acid
- CAS Number: 60-32-2
- PubChem CID: 564
- IUPHAR/BPS: 6574
- DrugBank: DB00513
- ChemSpider: 548
- UNII: U6F3787206
- KEGG: D00160
- ChEBI: CHEBI:16586
- ChEMBL: ChEMBL1046
- NIAID ChemDB: 018631
- CompTox Dashboard (EPA): DTXSID0020070
- ECHA InfoCard: 100.000.427

Chemical and physical data
- Formula: C_{6}H_{13}NO_{2}
- Molar mass: 131.175 g·mol^{−1}
- 3D model (JSmol): Interactive image
- Melting point: 205 °C (401 °F)
- SMILES: C(CCC(=O)O)CCN
- InChI: InChI=1S/C6H13NO2/c7-5-3-1-2-4-6(8)9/h1-5,7H2,(H,8,9); Key:SLXKOJJOQWFEFD-UHFFFAOYSA-N

Aminocaproic acid (also known as ε-aminocaproic acid [EACA], ε-Ahx, or 6-aminohexanoic acid) is a derivative and analogue of the amino acid lysine, which makes it an effective inhibitor for enzymes that bind that particular residue. Such enzymes include proteolytic enzymes like plasmin, the enzyme responsible for fibrinolysis. For this reason it is effective in treatment of certain bleeding disorders, and it is sold under the brand name Amicar. Aminocaproic acid is also an intermediate in the polymerization of Nylon-6, where it is formed by ring-opening hydrolysis of caprolactam. The crystal structure determination showed that the 6-aminohexanoic acid is present as a salt, at least in the solid state.

== Medical use ==
Aminocaproic acid (Amicar) is FDA-approved for use in the treatment of acute bleeding due to elevated fibrinolytic activity. It also carries an orphan drug designation from the FDA for the prevention of recurrent hemorrhage in patients with traumatic hyphema. In clinical practice, aminocaproic acid is frequently used off-label for control of bleeding in patients with severe thrombocytopenia, control of oral bleeding in patients with congenital and acquired coagulation disorders, control of perioperative bleeding associated with cardiac surgery, prevention of excessive bleeding in patients on anticoagulation therapy undergoing invasive dental procedures, and reduction of the risk of catastrophic hemorrhage in patients with acute promyelocytic leukemia.

EACA has the same mechanism of action as its more famous successor tranexamic acid (TXA): both are lysine analogs that exert an antifibrinolytic action. It is not as potent at TXA on a molar basis, but is potentially safer (in terms of seizures), cheaper (depending on the country), and/or more effective according to limited clinical data.

== Use in protein biochemistry ==
In biochemical analyses of membrane proteins, such as BN-PAGE, ε-aminocaproic acid is used to enhance membrane protein solubility while avoiding the addition of sodium chloride.
