= Reptilase time =

Laboratory blood test

- Purpose: blood test used to detect deficiency or abnormalities in fibrinogen

Reptilase time (RT) is a blood test used to detect deficiency or abnormalities in fibrinogen, especially in cases of heparin contamination.

Reptilase, an enzyme found in the venom of Bothrops snakes, has activity similar to thrombin. Unlike thrombin, reptilase is resistant to inhibition by antithrombin III. Thus, the reptilase time is not prolonged in blood samples containing heparin, hirudin, or direct thrombin inhibitors, whereas the thrombin time will be prolonged in these samples. Reptilase also differs from thrombin by releasing fibrinopeptide A, but not fibrinopeptide B, in its cleavage of fibrinogen.

Causes of prolonged thrombin time
Reptilase time	Cause	Further workup indicated
Normal	Heparin, hirudin, or direct thrombin inhibitor	Human TT and/or heparin assays
Prolonged	Hypo- or afibrinogenemia	Fibrinogen quantification
Prolonged	Dysfibrinogenemia	Fibrinogen activity assay
Prolonged	Fibrin(ogen) split products (FSP)	FSP or D-dimer quantification
