= Antifibrinolytic =

Agent that prevents fibrinolysis

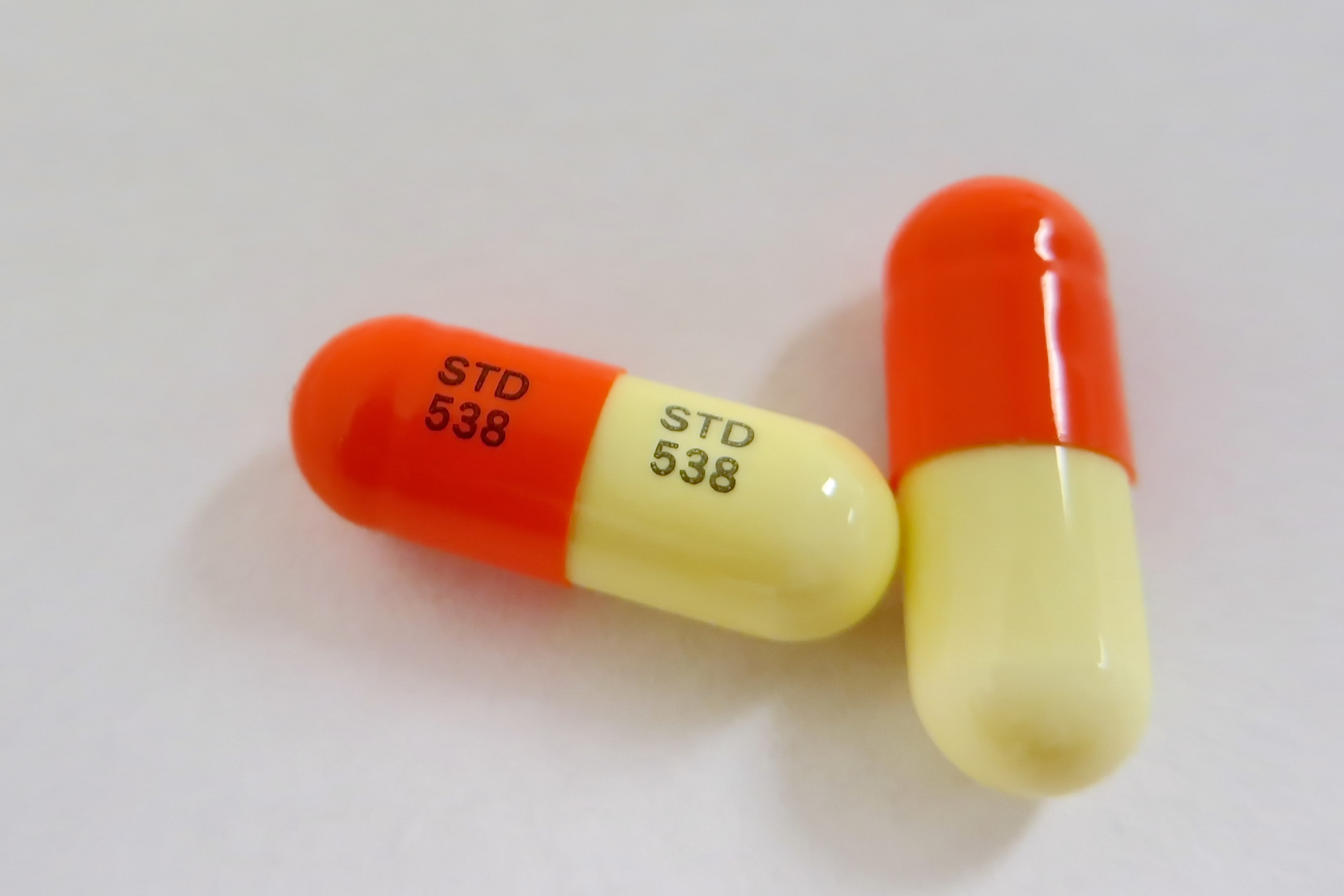

Antifibrinolytics are a class of medication that are inhibitors of fibrinolysis. Examples include aminocaproic acid (ε-aminocaproic acid) and tranexamic acid. These lysine-like drugs interfere with the formation of the fibrinolytic enzyme plasmin from its precursor plasminogen by plasminogen activators (primarily t-PA and u-PA) which takes place mainly in lysine rich areas on the surface of fibrin.

Another example, aprotinin, is a naturally occurring broad-spectrum protease inhibitor; some countries refuse to approve this medication because it supposedly has a greater mortality rate than its alternatives (tranexamic acid and aminocaproic acid) and causes damage to the kidneys and heart. It is widely agreed that systemic aprotinin use should be minimized due to these concerns.
