= Cryoprecipitate =

Blood product prepared from blood plasma

Clinical data
- Other names: Cryo, cryoprecipitated antihaemophilic factor, cryoprecipitated AHF

Identifiers
- ChemSpider: none

Cryoprecipitate, also called cryo for short, or Cryoprecipitate Antihemophilic factor (AHF), is a frozen blood product prepared from blood plasma. To create cryoprecipitate, plasma is slowly thawed to 1–6 °C. A cold-insoluble precipitate is formed, which is collected by centrifugation, resuspended in a small amount of residual plasma (generally 10–15 mL) and then re-frozen for storage. Cryoprecipitate contains fibrinogen, Factor VIII, Factor XIII and vWF. In many clinical contexts, use of cryoprecipitate has been replaced with use of clotting factor concentrates (where available), but the whole form is still routinely stocked by many hospital blood banks. Cryo can be stored at −18 °C or colder for 12 months from the original collection date or up to 36 months in Europe if stored below -25 °C. After thawing, single units of cryo (or units pooled using a sterile method) can be stored at 20–24 °C for up to 6 hours. If units of cryo are pooled in an open system, they can only be held at 20–24 °C for up to 4 hours. Presently cryo cannot be re-frozen for storage after it is thawed for use if it is not transfused.

Compatibility testing (cross-matching) before transfusion of cryoprecipitate are not necessary. However, cryoprecipitate should preferably be ABO compatible with the recipient's red cells. ABO-incompatible cryoprecipitate can be used with caution, particularly with large volumes. If a large volume of ABO-incompatible cryoprecipitate is used, the recipient may develop a positive direct antiglobulin test and, very rarely, mild haemolysis. Matching for RhD type is not necessary.

== Medical uses ==
Medical uses for giving cryoprecipitate include:

- Hypofibrinogenaemia (low fibrinogen levels), or dysfibrinogenaemia as can occur with massive transfusions.
- Bleeding from excessive anticoagulation – Fresh frozen plasma contains most of the coagulation factors and is an alternative choice when anticoagulation has to be reversed quickly.
- Massive haemorrhage.
- Disseminated intravascular coagulation
- Acute coagulopathy after TBI

Cryoprecipitate should not be used to treat haemophilia, von Willebrand’s disease or deficiencies of Factor XIII or fibronectin except in cases where alternative therapies are unavailable.

A typical adult dose is 10 units of whole blood-derived cryoprecipitate, equivalent to a fibrinogen dose of approximately 3−4 g.

== Adverse effects ==
Adverse effects reported with the usage of cryoprecipitate include hemolytic transfusion reactions, febrile non-hemolytic reactions, allergic reactions (ranging from urticaria to anaphylaxis), septic reactions, transfusion related acute lung injury, circulatory overload, transfusion-associated graft-versus-host disease, and post-transfusion purpura.

== Composition ==
Each unit (around 10 to 15 mL) typically provides:

- Fibrinogen 150–250 mg, although on average, usually higher
- Factor VIII 80–150 U
- Factor XIII 50–75 U
- von Willebrand factor 100–150 U

Cryoprecipitate also contains fibronectin; however, there are no clear indications for fibronectin replacement.

US standards require manufacturers to test at least four units each month, and the products must have a minimum of 150 mg or more of fibrinogen and 80 IU of factor VIII per unit. European standards require 140 mg or more of fibrinogen, 70 IU of factor VIII and 100 IU of vWF per unit.

== History ==
While the current method for producing cryoprecipitate was developed by Judith Graham Pool from Stanford University in 1964, it was initially approved in 1971 by the U.S. Food and Drug Administration under the name Cryoprecipitated AHF for the Hoxworth Blood Center University of Cincinnati Medical Center.
