= Multiple electrode aggregometry =

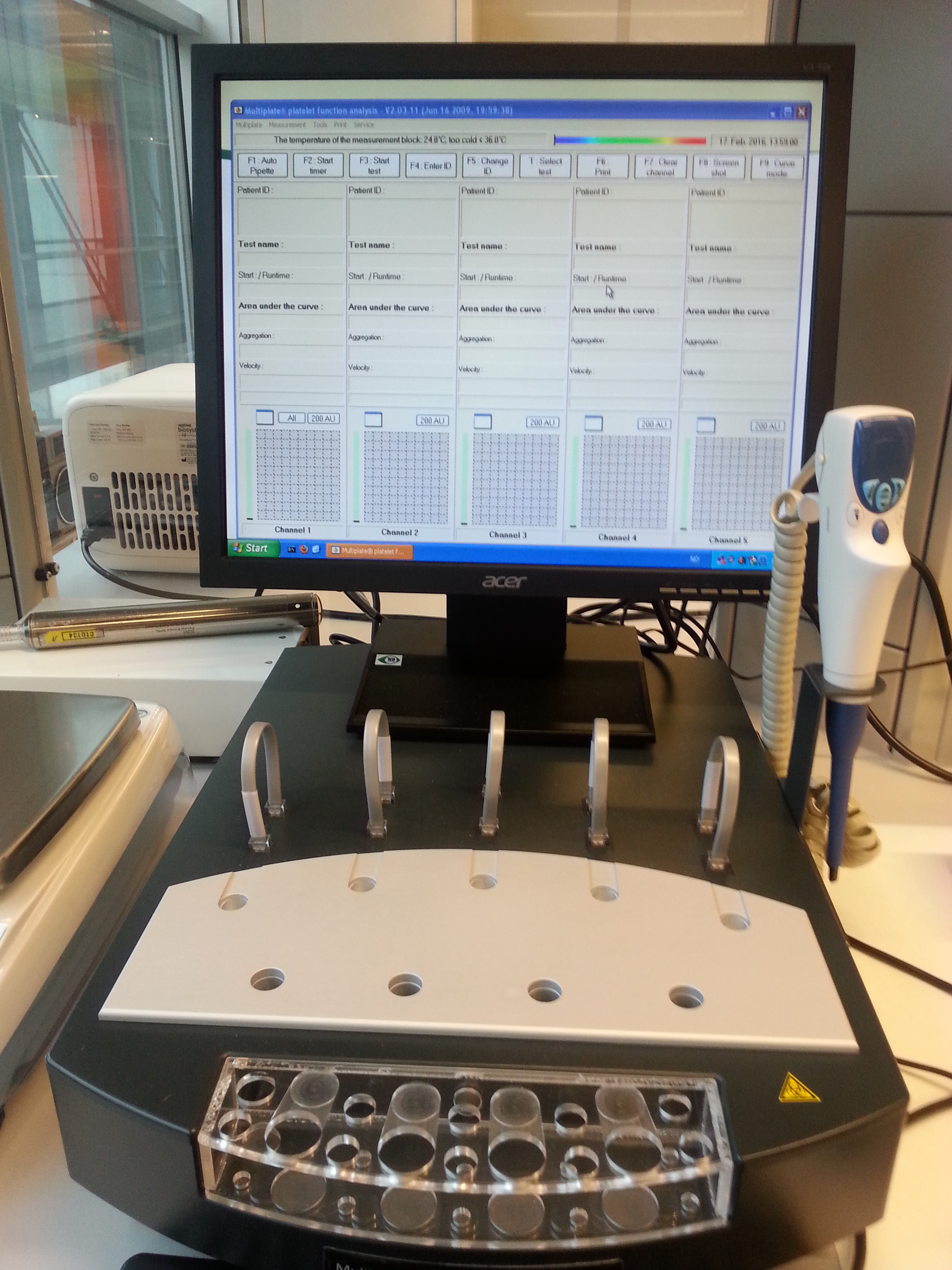
- The Multiplate Analyzer
- Purpose: Determining platelet function
- Test of: Whole blood

Multiplate multiple electrode aggregometry (MEA) is a test of platelet function in whole blood. The test can be used to assess platelet function, monitor antiplatelet therapy, and is also investigated as a potential predictor of transfusion requirements and bleeding risk in cardiac surgery.

== Instrument ==
The Multiplate MEA Analyzer (Roche Diagnostics International Ltd) has 5 channels for simultaneous measurement of several samples or agonists. The instrument detects change in electrical impedance when platelets aggregate on metal electrodes in the test cuvette. Each cuvette contains two pairs of sensor electrodes, each of which measures the change in impedance. The duplicate sensors serve as an integrated quality control, and the analysis is accepted if the correlation coefficient of the measurements is greater than 0.98. The difference of each curve from the mean curve is also calculated, and a difference of less than 20% is accepted. The test cuvettes also contain a teflon coated magnetic stirring bar. The increase in impedance as aggregation occurs is transformed into aggregation units (AU) and plotted against time on the computer screen.

== Sample ==
The manufacturer recommends the use of hirudin as anticoagulant for samples to be tested, but studies have shown that heparin is a good alternative. 300 μL of blood is needed for each analysis, and is diluted with the same amount of saline. After pipetting blood and saline into the cuvette, the test is incubated for three minutes before the chosen agonist is added. The test is then started, and platelet aggregation is recorded at approximately 0.5 second intervals for six minutes. Three parameters are calculated: aggregation, velocity and area under the curve (AUC). Aggregation (in AU) is the maximum height of the aggregation curve, and velocity (in AU/min) is the maximum slope of the curve. AUC is the most important parameter. It is recorded in Units (U), and is affected by both the height and the slope of the aggregation curve, and is the best overall measure of platelet activity.

== Multiplate Tests/Reagents ==
Platelet aggregation function by main disorders and agonists
	ADP	Epinephrine	Collagen	Ristocetin
P2Y receptor inhibitor or defect	Decreased	Normal	Normal	Normal
Adrenergic receptor defect	Normal	Decreased	Normal	Normal
Collagen receptor defect	Normal	Normal	Decreased or absent	Normal
Von Willebrand disease (except Type 2B); Bernard–Soulier syndrome	Normal	Normal	Normal	Decreased or absent
Glanzmann's thrombasthenia	Decreased	Decreased	Decreased	Normal or decreased

=== ADPtest ===
Adenosine diphosphate (ADP) is a platelet agonist. When it is added to saline-diluted whole blood in the test cuvette, it stimulates the ADP receptors on platelets, activating the platelets. The activation of the platelets leads to shape change and degranulation, and the released content of the granules further activates the platelets. Activation also induces a conformational change in the glycoprotein IIb/IIIa (GPIIb/IIIa) receptor, giving it high affinity for fibrinogen. Binding of fibrinogen to GPIIb/IIIa receptors leads to platelet-to-platelet bridges and results in platelet aggregation. Antiplatelet drugs like clopidogrel and prasugrel irreversibly inhibit the ADP receptor P2Y12, leading to a decreased ADP-induced platelet aggregation. Drugs that inhibit the GPIIb/IIIa receptor, e.g. eptifibatide, can also reduce or eliminate the ADP-induced platelet response.

=== ASPItest ===
In the ASPItest arachidonic acid is added to the saline-diluted blood sample. Arachidonic acid is converted to prostaglandin H2 (PGH2) by cyclooxygenase-1 (COX1), and PGH2 is then converted to thromboxane A2 (TXA2) by thromboxane synthase. TXA2 increases platelet aggregation, promotes degranulation and stimulates platelet activation. Inhibition of COX1, as with acetylsalicylic acid, and inhibition or absence of GPIIb/IIIa receptor, as seen in Glanzmann's thrombasthenia, will reduce platelet aggregation in response to arachidonic acid.

=== COLtest ===
Collagen is added to the sample-saline mix, and binds to collagen-receptors on platelets. This leads to a release of arachidonic acid, which is converted to the potent platelet activator TXA2. COLtest is sensitive to inhibition of COX1 and GPIIb/IIIa and to Glanzmann's thrombasthenia.

=== RISTOtest ===
Ristocetin forms complexes with von Willebrand factor (vWF) that bind to the glycoprotein Ib (GP1b) receptors on platelets, causing platelet activation and aggregation. Reduced or absent aggregation in response to ristocetin can be caused by a lack of or reduction of vWF, as seen in von Willebrand disease (vWD), or absence or reduction in numbers of GP1b receptors, as in Bernard–Soulier syndrome (BSS). RISTOtest can be performed in two concentrations; RISTOhigh and RISTOlow. In RISTOhigh, a ristocetin concentration of 0,77 mg/mL is applied. This normally induces a strong platelet aggregation, and low or absent aggregation can be caused by the earlier mentioned conditions vWD and BSS. In RISTOlow, the ristocetin concentration is just 0,2 mg/mL, and at a level that does not normally induce a strong aggregation response. This test can detect if vWF shows a stronger than normal tendency to aggregate platelets, which can be seen in a subtype of vWD called vWDIIb.

=== TRAPtest ===
Thrombin receptor activating peptide-6 (TRAP-6) activates platelets through the thrombin receptor protease activated receptor-1 (PAR-1). Binding of TRAP-6 to PAR-1 causes a conformational change in the GPIIb/IIIa receptors on platelets, giving them high affinity for fibrinogen. Fibrinogen then binds to the receptors, crosslinking several platelets and causing aggregation. Aggregation in TRAPtest may be reduced or absent in Glanzmann's thrombasthenia, where GPIIb/IIIa receptors are few or absent, or if the patient is taking a GPIIb/IIIa antagonist. Traptest has only minor sensitivity for inhibition of COX1 and ADP-receptors.

=== ASA Reagent ===
Adding ASA (acetylsalicylic acid) reagent to a blood sample reduces the aggregation responses in ASPItest and COLtest. ASA irreversibly inhibits COX1 in platelets, thereby inhibiting the production of TXA2. The ASA Reagent is used as a quality control in the platelet function testing with Multiplate, allowing the assessment of abnormal platelet responses in ASPItest and COLtest.

=== GPIIb/IIIa Antagonist Reagent ===
This reagent is used as a quality control in Multiplate platelet function testing. The GPIIb/IIIa antagonist blocks the binding of fibrinogen to the GPIIb/IIIa receptors, preventing the formation of platelet-fibrinogen bonds and resulting in significantly reduced platelet aggregation in response to all agonists. The antagonist reagent is used together with TRAP-test, and allows assessment of a positive control.

=== Prostaglandin E1 Reagent ===
Prostaglandin E1 (PGE1) is a platelet inhibitor that causes an increase in cyclic adenosine monophosphate (cAMP) in platelets by stimulating adenylyl cyclase activity. cAMP is an intracellular signaling molecule, and the increase in cAMP inhibits calcium mobilization and platelet aggregation induced by activation of the ADP receptor P2Y1. Activation of the P2Y1 receptor initiates platelet aggregation in response to ADP. The P2Y1 receptor is required for ADP-induced platelet activation, but is not sufficient for a full platelet aggregation in response to ADP. cAMP inhibits platelet aggregation, and decreased amounts of cAMP in platelets lead to platelet aggregation. The PGE1 reagent is used together with the ADP test for two purposes: the assessment of ADP high sensitivity (HS) and of positive controls of the ADPtest. When a small amount of PGE1 (20 μL) is added to the ADPtest, it induces a moderat inhibition of aggregation in normal samples, but greatly increases the sensitivity of platelets to inhibition by clopidogrel. This is why the modified test is called "High Sensitivity". Adding 50 μL of PGE1 to the ADPtest leads to a strong inhibition of ADP induced aggregation, and is used for assessment of positive controls of the ADPtest.
