= Erik Adolf von Willebrand =

Finnish physician (1870–1949)

- Erik Adolf von Willebrand, c. 1915
- Born: 1 February 1870; Nikolaistad (Vaasa), Grand Duchy of Finland, Russian Empire
- Died: 12 September 1949 (aged 79); Pernå, Finland
- Education: University of Helsinki
- Known for: Von Willebrand disease; Von Willebrand factor
- Medical career
- Profession: Physician
- Institutions: University of Helsinki; Deaconess Hospital, Helsinki
- Research: Hematology, thermotherapy, phototheraphy, metabolism, obesity, gout
- Notable works: Hereditär pseudohemofili (1926)

Erik Adolf von Willebrand (1 February 1870 – 12 September 1949) was a Finnish physician who made major contributions to hematology. Von Willebrand disease and von Willebrand factor are named after him. He also researched metabolism, obesity and gout, and was one of the first Finnish physicians to use insulin to treat a diabetic coma.

Von Willebrand qualified in medicine in 1896 from the University of Helsinki, where he received his Ph.D. in 1899. He worked at the University of Helsinki from 1900 until 1930. From 1908 until his retirement in 1933, he was the head of the department of medicine at the Deaconess Hospital in Helsinki, where he also was physician-in-chief from 1922 to 1931.

In 1924, Von Willebrand was consulted about a young girl with a bleeding disorder. He described this disorder in 1926, distinguishing it from hemophilia. The disorder was named after him, becoming known as von Willebrand disease. The cause of the disease was later discovered to be a deficiency of a protein, now known as von Willebrand factor, that enables hemostasis.

== Early life and education ==
Von Willebrand was born on 1 February 1870 in Nikolaistad (Vaasa), then part of the Grand Duchy of Finland in the Russian Empire. He was the third child of Fredrik Magnus von Willebrand and Signe Estlander. Fredrik had received a military education and later became an engineer. Von Willebrand belonged to a German noble family; his ancestors settled in Finland in the 18th century. His family belonged to the Swedish-speaking minority in Finland.

Von Willebrand attended Vaasa Lyceum, where he excelled in botany, chemistry and zoology. During this time, he spent his summers collecting botanical, lepidopterological and ornithological specimens, and his winters exploring the Gulf of Bothnia. After obtaining his baccalaureate in 1890, he began his studies at the University of Helsinki, then known as the Imperial Alexander University in Finland.

Prior to qualifying as a physician in 1896, he spent the summers of 1894 and 1895 working as a junior physician at a spa in Åland. After graduation, Von Willebrand became assistant physician in the department of medicine at the Deaconess Hospital in Helsinki, where Ossian Schauman supervised his doctoral thesis on the changes in hemocyte count after venesection. Von Willebrand's early hematologic investigations also yielded a study on the regeneration of blood in anemia and a description of a method for the staining of blood smears using eosin and methylene blue.

He received his Ph.D. in 1899 from the University of Helsinki, for the thesis Zur Kenntnis der Blutveränderungen nach Aderlässen ("Blood Changes after Venesection").

== Career ==
After the completion of his dissertation in 1899, Von Willebrand was appointed chief physician at a spa in Heinola, and he shifted his interest from hematology to applied physiology. From 1900 to 1906, he lectured anatomy and later physiology at the University of Helsinki. During this period, he researched thermotherapy, particularly the health effects of saunas, and phototherapy, and invented an apparatus for measuring the dermal excretion of carbon dioxide and water.

Von Willebrand's interest in internal medicine outweighed his interest in balneology and physical therapy, however, and in 1907 he took up the position of chief physician at a municipal hospital in Helsinki. In 1908, he was appointed docent in internal medicine at the University of Helsinki. Concomitant with this appointment, he succeeded Schauman as head of the department of medicine at the Deaconess Hospital in Helsinki. He also took over the laboratory at the Deaconess Hospital, which was renowned for its hematological services. In this position, he studied metabolism, obesity and gout. In 1912, he developed a method for measuring ketone bodies in urine, and the following year discussed dietetic treatments for diabetes. In 1918, nearly two decades after his last paper of the sort, Von Willebrand resumed his publishing of hematologic works, releasing studies on aplastic, hypochromic and pernicious anaemia. He also published a study regarding heart valve conditions based on data from over 10,000 autopsies performed in Helsinki from 1867 to 1916, and was a pioneer in the use of insulin, describing in 1922 its use in the treatment of diabetic comas. In February 1924, he successfully brought a moribund patient out of a diabetic coma through the application of insulin, using some of the first batch of the hormone ever delivered to Finland.

Von Willebrand remained at the University of Helsinki until 1930. He was physician-in-chief of the Deaconess Hospital from 1922 to 1931, and became honorary professor in 1930. He remained head of the Deaconess Hospital's department of medicine until his retirement in 1933. Von Willebrand continued to publish articles after his retirement. On his 75th birthday, he released his last paper, entitled En genetisk blodsykdom blant innbyggerne på Åland ("A genetic blood disease amongst the islanders of Åland").

=== Von Willebrand disease ===
In April 1924, Von Willebrand was consulted about Hjördis Sundblom, a five-year-old girl with a severe bleeding condition. Hjördis was the ninth of 11 children in a family from Föglö, one of the Åland Islands. She experienced regular bleeding from the nose, lips, gums and skin, as did six of her siblings. Three of her sisters had died due to the condition, and eight years later Hjördis died due to menorrhagia. Hjördis was brought to Von Willebrand's laboratory in Helsinki and he did not himself visit Föglö, but with the cooperation of a local schoolteacher he mapped the family pedigree. He found that the condition was present in the three previous generations, on both sides of Hjördis' family. Sixteen of the 35 women analysed had the condition (to a mild or severe degree), and 7 of the 31 men analysed had the condition (to a slight degree). An analysis of the heredity involved led Von Willebrand to assume the inheritance was dominant, in contrast to hemophilia which was known to be a recessive disorder. The condition also differed from hemophilia in that it affected females at least as often as males.

He published a Swedish-language article in 1926 about the disease, titled Hereditär pseudohemofili ("Hereditary pseudohemophilia"). He referenced six previous publications from the years of 1876 to 1922, totalling 19 cases on families with bleeding diatheses. The earlier authors attributed the condition to hemophilia (even in the cases of females) or to thrombopathy, which was discovered shortly before as the cause of what had previously been known as purpura hemorrhagica or Werlhof's disease. Von Willebrand also conducted hematological examinations on Hjördis and some of her family members. He recorded a normal or slightly reduced number of platelets and an undisturbed clot retraction, unlike Glanzmann's thrombasthenia. The bleeding time (Duke) was greatly prolonged, extending to more than 2 hours in some cases, while the clotting time was within the normal range. He concluded that the disease was either a new form of thrombopathy or a condition of the capillary endothelium.

Von Willebrand published a German-language version of Hereditär pseudohemofili in 1931, which attracted international attention in the disease. Blood samples were sent to researchers at the Johns Hopkins Hospital in Baltimore, Maryland, and to several researchers in Europe, including Rudolf Jürgens in Leipzig. Jürgens contacted Von Willebrand and together they conducted studies on his patients. They also researched hemorheology, seeking to understand the underlying mechanism of bleeding disorders. In 1933 they co-authored an account of the disease, renaming it "constitutional thrombopathy". Numerous papers were subsequently published on the disease and it became eponymously known as von Willebrand disease between the late 1930s and the early 1940s.

In 1957, it was discovered that von Willebrand disease is caused by a deficiency of a protein in blood plasma that enables hemostasis. The protein was characterised in 1971, and is known as von Willebrand factor. Von Willebrand factor has two functions. Firstly, it is the carrier molecule for factor VIII, the anti-hemophilic factor. Secondly, it promotes the aggregation of platelets and attachment to the vessel wall. In 2011, Jan van Gijn and Joost P. Gijselhart, writing in the Nederlands Tijdschrift voor Geneeskunde, remarked that Von Willebrand was not far wrong when he named the disease "hereditary pseudohemophilia".

== Personal life and death ==
In his personal life, Von Willebrand was described as a mild-mannered and modest man. He married Walborg Maria Antell in 1900, and had two daughters. As a member of the Swedish-speaking minority in Finland, he was a supporter of Ossian Schauman's Folkhälsan, which promoted social welfare and health care for Swedish-speaking Finns. His research on the bleeding condition of the Åland islanders was of particular interest to him, as it was a hereditary disorder that affected the Swedish-speaking minority. After his retirement in 1933 he became an avid gardener and a supporter of nature conservation.

Von Willebrand died on 12 September 1949, at the age of 79. In 1994, he was commemorated with a stamp issued by Åland. The stamp was one in a set of two: the other commemorated Erik Jorpes, known for his pioneering work on heparin.

== Publications ==
The following list of publications is compiled from Lassila, R.; Lindberg, O. (2013). "Erik von Willebrand". Haemophilia. 19 (5): 645.

- Schauman, Ossian; Von Willebrand, E. A. (1899). "Einige bemerkungen über die blutregeneration bei der Chlorose". Berliner Klinische Wochenschrift (in German). 1.
- Tallqvist, Theodor; Von Willebrand, E. A. (1899). "Zur Morphologie der weissen Blutkörperchen des Hundes und des Kaninchens". Skandinavisches Archiv für Physiologie (in German). 10.
- Von Willebrand, E. A. (1899). Zur Kenntnis der Blutveränderungen nach Aderlässen (Dissertation) (in German).
- Von Willebrand, E. A. (1901). "Eine Methode für gleichzeitige Combinationsfärbung von Bluttrockenprepataten mit Eosin und Methylenblau". Deutsche Medizinische Wochenschrift (in German). 4.
- Von Willebrand, E. A. (1902). "Über die Kohlensäuren- und Wasserascheidung durch die haut des Mänchens". Skandinavisches Archiv für Physiologie (in German). 13: 337–358. doi:10.1111/j.1748-1716.1902.tb00520.x.
- Von Willebrand, E. A. (1902). "Om hetluftbehandlingens fysiologi". Finska Läkaresällskapets Handlingar (in Swedish). 44: 435–456.
- Von Willebrand, E. A. (1902). "En universal färgningsmetod med eosin och metylenblätt". Finska Läkaresällskapets Handlingar (in Swedish). 44: 543–552.
- Von Willebrand, E. A. (1903). "Om den lokala hetluftsbehandlingen enligt Biers metod". Finska Läkaresällskapets Handlingar (in Swedish). 45: 197–218.
- Von Willebrand, E. A. (1903). "Om den moderna ljusbehandlingen". Finska Läkaresällskapets Handlingar (in Swedish). 45: 435–456.
- Von Willebrand, E. A. (1903). "Morbus Addison med atrofi av binjurarna". Finska Läkaresällskapets Handlingar (in Swedish). 45: 536–592.
- Von Willebrand, E. A. (1906). "Zur Physiologie und Klinik der Heissluftbehandlung". Skandinavisches Archiv für Physiologie (in German). 19: 123–161. doi:10.1111/j.1748-1716.1907.tb00017.x.
- Von Willebrand, E. A. (1906–1907). "Om fettsotens orsaker och dess behandling". Kliniska Föredrag Nord Tidsk Ther (in Swedish). 5: 129–137, 161–170, 199–212.
- Von Willebrand, E. A. (1907). "Ett fall av cerebral hemianopsi". Finska Läkaresällskapets Handlingar (in Swedish). 49.
- Von Willebrand, E. A. (1907–1908). "Om giktens behandling". Kliniska Föredrag Nord Tidsk Ther (in Swedish). 6: 353–358.
- Von Willebrand, E. A. (1910). "Bidrag till kännedomen om meralgia paresthetica". Finska Läkaresällskapets Handlingar (in Swedish). 52: 491–505.
- Von Willebrand, E. A. (1911–1912). "Om den konstitutionella fettsotens patogenes och behandling". Nord Tidsk Ther (in Swedish). 10: 132–143.
- Von Willebrand, E. A. (1911). "Om sockersjukans patogenes enligt nyare teorier". Finska Läkaresällskapets Handlingar (in Swedish). 53: 363–370.
- Von Willebrand, E. A. (1912). "En metod for approximativ uppskattning af acetonkroppsmängden i urinen". Finska Läkaresällskapets Handlingar (in Swedish). 54: 515–524.
- Von Willebrand, E. A. (1913). "Om behandlingen av diabetes med sockerlavemang". Finska Läkaresällskapets Handlingar (in Swedish). 55: 412–423.
- Von Willebrand, E. A. (1914). "Kolhydratkurer och alkalibehandling vid diabetes mellitus". Finska Läkaresällskapets Handlingar (in Swedish). 56: 1277–1334.
- Von Willebrand, E. A.; Cedercreutz, Axel (1915). "Lärebog i intern medicin". Finska Läkaresällskapets Handlingar (Book review) (in Swedish). 57: 210–219.
- Von Willebrand, E. A. (1918). "Till kännedom om den aplastiska anemien". Finska Läkaresällskapets Handlingar (in Swedish). 60: 859–922.
- Von Willebrand, E. A. (1918). "Klinisk-statistiska studier ofver hjärtvalvelfelen". Finska Läkaresällskapets Handlingar (in Swedish). 60: 1107–1143.
- Von Willebrand, E. A. (1922). "Perniziöse Anemie mit ungewöhnlichem Remissionsstadium". Acta Medica Scandinavica (in German). 56: 419–431. doi:10.1111/j.0954-6820.1922.tb18493.x.
- Von Willebrand, E. A. (1923). "Die gesundheitszustand bei Personen, die früher an Chlorose gelitten haben". Acta Medica Scandinavica (in German).
- Von Willebrand, E. A. (1924). "Coma diabeticum- Insulinbehandling". Finska Läkaresällskapets Handlingar (in Swedish). 66: 255–273.
- Von Willebrand, E. A. (1926). "Hereditär pseudohemofili". Finska Läkaresällskapets Handlingar (in Swedish). 68: 87–112.
- Von Willebrand, E. A. (1931). "Über hereditäre pseudohämophilie". Acta Medica Scandinavica (in German). 76 (4–6): 521. doi:10.1111/j.0954-6820.1931.tb18363.x.
- Von Willebrand, E. A. (1933). "Hepatogen hemorrhagisk diates". Finska Läkaresällskapets Handlingar (in Swedish). 75: 829–846.
- Von Willebrand, E. A.; Jürgens, Rudolf (1933). "Über ein neues vererbbares Blutungsübel:Die konstitutionelle Thrombopathie". Deutsches Archiv für klinische Medizin (in German). 175: 453–583.
- Von Willebrand, E. A.; Jürgens, Rudolf (1933). "Über eine neue Bluterkrankheit, die konstitutionelle thrombopathie". Klinische Wochenschrift (in German). 12 (11): 414. doi:10.1007/bf01756258. S2CID 30963231.
- Von Willebrand, E. A.; Jürgens, Rudolf; Dahlberg, Ulf (1934). "Konstitutionell trombopati, en ärftlig blodarsjukdom". Finska Läkaresällskapets Handlingar (in Swedish). 76: 194–232.
- Von Willebrand, E. A. (1938). "Rasfrågor i modern belysning". Östnylandsk Ungdom (in Swedish): 5.
- Von Willebrand, E. A. (1939). "Rasfrågor i modern belysning II". Östnylandsk Ungdom (in Swedish): 3.
- Von Willebrand, E. A.; Olin, J. (1939). "Nyare erfarenheter om de hemorrhagiska diateserna". Nordisk Medicin (in Swedish). 2: 1743.
- Von Willebrand, E. A. (1941). "De hereditära trombopatierna". Nordisk Medicin (in Swedish). 12: 3317.
- Von Willebrand, E. A. (1942). "Om naturskyddet i Finland". Östnylandsk Ungdom (in Swedish).
- Von Willebrand, E. A. (1942). "Svenskbygdens befolkningsfråga". Östnylandsk Ungdom (in Swedish).
- Lemberg, Bertel; Von Willebrand, E. A. (1939). "Naturstudier och naturskydd i Pernå skärgård". Finlands Natur (in Swedish). 1: 9.
- Von Willebrand, E. A. (1945). "En genetisk blodsykdom blant innbyggerne på Åland". Nordenskiöldsamfundets Tidskr (in Swedish). 5: 44–55.
