= Ristocetin-induced platelet aggregation =

Assay for live platelet function

- Purpose: It measures platelet aggregation with the help of von Willebrand factor

The ristocetin-induced platelet aggregation (RIPA) is an ex vivo assay for live platelet function. It measures platelet aggregation with the help of von Willebrand factor (vWF) and exogenous antibiotic ristocetin added in a graded fashion. It is similar to the ristocetin cofactor assay but has the added benefit in that it helps in the diagnosis of type 2B/pseudo von Willebrand disease (vWD) and Bernard–Soulier syndrome because it uses patient's live endogenous platelets, whereas ristocetin cofactor assay tests the function of only the vWF and not the platelets. Ristocetin cofactor assay uses the patient's platelet poor plasma (with vWF but no platelets) and adds ristocetin and exogenous formalin-fixed platelets which can passively agglutinate (but not actively aggregate, as they are dead). Formalin does not allow the extrinsic platelets to secrete the vWF of their α-granules, and thus only the activity of the intrinsic vWF is tested.

In an unknown fashion, the antibiotic ristocetin causes von Willebrand factor to bind the platelet receptor glycoprotein Ib (GpIb), so when ristocetin is added to normal blood, it causes agglutination of fixed platelets or initiates the initial agglutination phase of aggregation of live platelets.

The results of the ristocetin-induced platelet aggregation in some characteristic diseases are the following:

- Type 1 vWD: hypoactive agglutination occurs (consistent with ristocetin cofactor assay results)
- Type 2A vWD: hypoactive agglutination occurs (consistent with ristocetin cofactor assay results)
- Type 2B vWD: hyperactive agglutination occurs (when the ristocetin cofactor assay is used, the agglutination is hypoactive)
- Type 2M vWD: hypoactive agglutination occurs (consistent with ristocetin cofactor assay results)
- Type 2N vWD: normal agglutination occurs (consistent with ristocetin cofactor assay results)
- Type 3 vWD: no agglutination occurs (consistent with ristocetin cofactor assay results)
- Pseudo-vWD: hyperactive agglutination occurs (when the ristocetin cofactor assay is used, the agglutination is hypoactive)
- Bernard-Soulier syndrome: hypoactive agglutination occurs (when the ristocetin cofactor assay is used, the agglutination is normal)

INTERPRETATION OF TEST RAT+ Ve= normal (gp1b & vWF present) RAT-ve=abnormal(gp1b & vWF absent)
