= Coagulopathy =

Condition involving impaired blood clotting ability

- Other names: Bleeding disorder
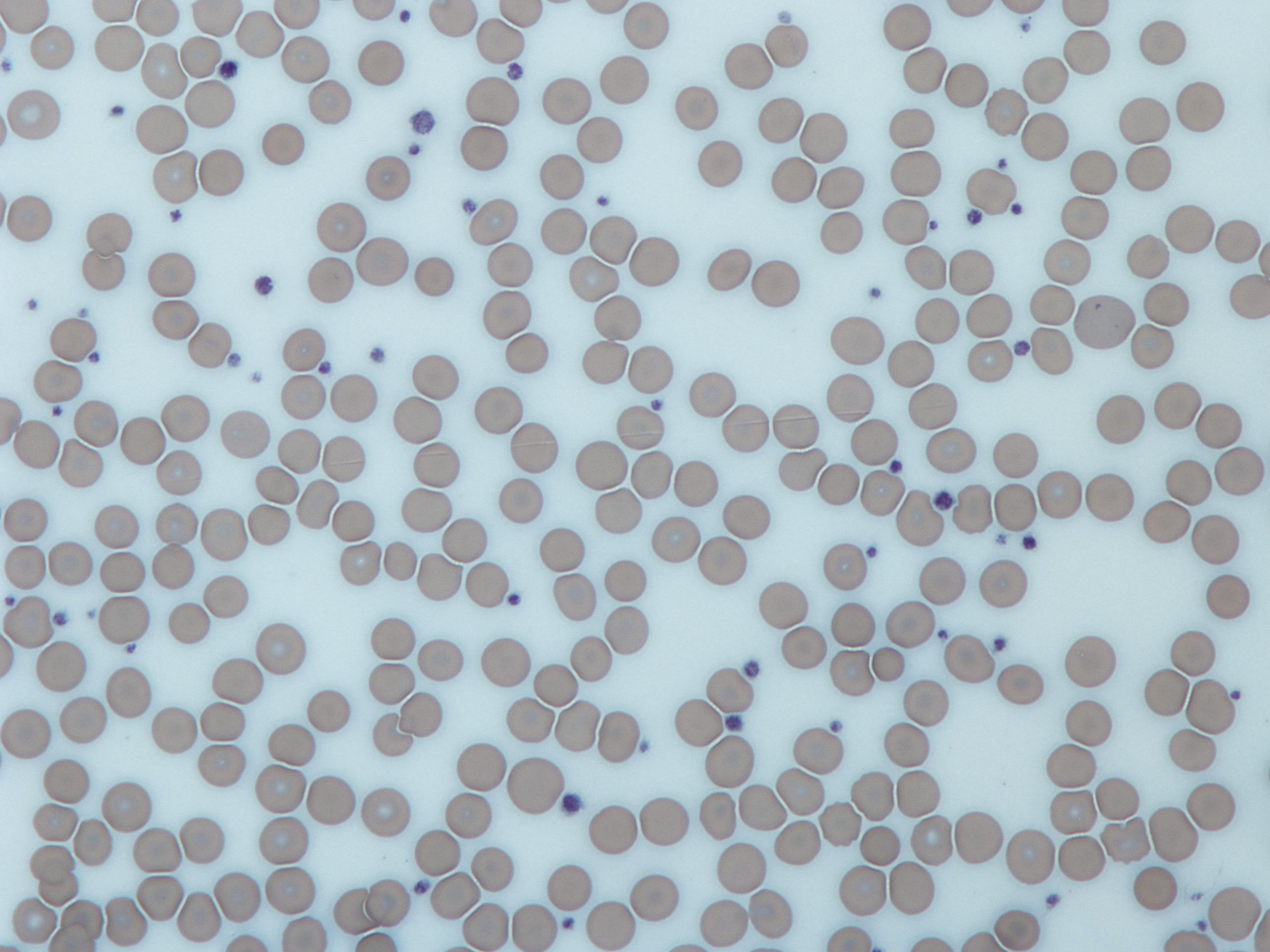
- Platelets
- Specialty: Hematology

Coagulopathy (also called a bleeding disorder) is a condition in which the blood's ability to coagulate (form clots) is impaired. This condition can cause a tendency toward prolonged or excessive bleeding (bleeding diathesis), which may occur spontaneously or following an injury or medical and dental procedures.

Coagulopathies are sometimes erroneously referred to as "clotting disorders", but a clotting disorder is the opposite, defined as a predisposition to excessive clot formation (thrombus), also known as a hypercoagulable state or thrombophilia.

== Signs and symptoms ==
Coagulopathy may cause uncontrolled internal or external bleeding. Left untreated, uncontrolled bleeding may cause damage to joints, muscles, or internal organs and may be life-threatening. People should seek immediate medical care for serious symptoms, including heavy external bleeding, blood in the urine or stool, double vision, severe head or neck pain, repeated vomiting, difficulty walking, convulsions, or seizures. They should seek prompt medical care if they experience mild but unstoppable external bleeding or joint swelling and stiffness.

== Mechanism ==
The normal clotting process depends on the interplay of various proteins in the blood. Coagulopathy may be caused by reduced levels or absence of blood-clotting proteins, known as clotting factors or coagulation factors. Genetic disorders, such as hemophilia and Von Willebrand disease, can cause a reduction in clotting factors.

Anticoagulants such as warfarin will also prevent clots from forming properly. Coagulopathy may also occur as a result of dysfunction or reduced levels of platelets (small disk-shaped bodies in the bloodstream that aid in the clotting process).

== Acute traumatic coagulopathy ==
In 2003, Karim Brohi, Professor of Trauma Sciences at Queen Mary University of London, first introduced the term acute traumatic coagulopathy (ATC), establishing that coagulopathy induced by trauma results in:

- more severe bleeding
- multi-organ failure
- high mortality

== Treatment ==
If someone has coagulopathy, their health care provider may help them manage their symptoms with medications or replacement therapy. In replacement therapy, the reduced or absent clotting factors are replaced with proteins derived from human blood or created in the laboratory. This therapy may be given either to treat bleeding that has already begun or to prevent bleeding from occurring.

=== Critical care ===
One area of treatment is managing people with major bleeding in a critical setting, like an emergency department. In these situations, the common treatment is transfusing a combination of red cells with one of the following options:

- Blood plasma
- Prothrombin complex concentrate, factor XIII, and fibrinogen
- Fibrinogen with tranexamic acid

The use of tranexamic acid is the only option that is currently supported by a large, randomized, controlled clinical trial, and is given to people with major bleeding after trauma. There are several possible risks to treating coagulopathies, such as transfusion-related acute lung injury, acute respiratory distress syndrome, multiple organ dysfunction syndrome, major hemorrhage, and venous thromboembolism.

Laboratory findings in various platelet and coagulation disorders
| Condition | Prothrombin time | Partial thromboplastin time | Bleeding time | Platelet count |
|---|---|---|---|---|
| Vitamin K deficiency or warfarin | Prolonged | Normal or mildly prolonged | Unaffected | Unaffected |
| Disseminated intravascular coagulation | Prolonged | Prolonged | Prolonged | Decreased |
| Von Willebrand disease | Unaffected | Prolonged or unaffected | Prolonged | Unaffected |
| Hemophilia | Unaffected | Prolonged | Unaffected | Unaffected |
| Aspirin | Unaffected | Unaffected | Prolonged | Unaffected |
| Thrombocytopenia | Unaffected | Unaffected | Prolonged | Decreased |
| Liver failure, early | Prolonged | Unaffected | Unaffected | Unaffected |
| Liver failure, end-stage | Prolonged | Prolonged | Prolonged | Decreased |
| Uremia | Unaffected | Unaffected | Prolonged | Unaffected |
| Congenital afibrinogenemia | Prolonged | Prolonged | Prolonged | Unaffected |
| Factor V deficiency | Prolonged | Prolonged | Unaffected | Unaffected |
| Factor X deficiency as seen in amyloid purpura | Prolonged | Prolonged | Unaffected | Unaffected |
| Glanzmann's thrombasthenia | Unaffected | Unaffected | Prolonged | Unaffected |
| Bernard–Soulier syndrome | Unaffected | Unaffected | Prolonged | Decreased or unaffected |
| Factor XI deficiency | Unaffected | Prolonged | Unaffected | Unaffected |
| C1INH deficiency | Unaffected | Shortened | Unaffected | Unaffected |

== See also ==
- Trauma triad of death
- Hypocoagulability
- Hypercoagulability
