= Clotting time =

Medical laboratory blood test

- Specialty: Haematology
- MeSH: D014914
- MedlinePlus: 003652

Clotting time is a general term for the time required for a sample of blood to form a clot, or, in medical terms, coagulate. The term "clotting time" is often used when referring to tests such as the prothrombin time (PT), activated partial thromboplastin time (aPTT or PTT), activated clotting time (ACT), thrombin time (TT), or Reptilase time. These tests are coagulation studies performed to assess the natural clotting ability of a sample of blood. In a clinical setting, healthcare providers will order one of these tests to evaluate a patient's blood for any abnormalities in the time it takes for their blood to clot. Each test involves adding a specific substance to the blood and measuring the time until the blood forms fibrin which is one of the first signs of clotted blood. Each test points to a different component of the clotting sequence which is made up of coagulation factors that help form clots. Abnormal results could be due to a number of reasons including, but, not limited to, deficiency in clotting factors, dysfunction of clotting factors, blood-thinning medications, medication side-effects, platelet deficiency, inherited bleeding or clotting disorders, liver disease, or advanced illness resulting in a medical emergency known as disseminated intravascular coagulation (DIC).

== Methods ==
There are various methods for determining the clotting time, the prototype historical method being the capillary tube method. It is affected by calcium ion levels and many diseases. The normal range of clotting times is 2-8 minutes.

For the measurement of clotting time by the test tube method, blood is placed in a glass test tube and kept at 37°C. The required time for the blood to clot is measured.

There are several other methods, including testing for those on blood thinners, such as heparin or warfarin. Activated partial thromboplastin time (aPTT) is used for heparin studies and the normal range is 20–36 seconds, depending upon which type of activator is used in the study. Prothrombin time (PT) is used for warfarin studies and the normal values differ for men and women. Adult male PT normal range is 9.6–11.8 seconds, while adult females' normal range is 9.5–11.3 seconds. Internationalized normalized ratio (INR) is also a warfarin study, with therapeutic ranges of 2–3 for standard warfarin and 3–4.5 for high-dose warfarin. In a veterinary study of bovine animals, the mean ACT was 145 seconds with a range of 120–180 seconds. Standard deviations were 18 and 13 for the first and second sampling, respectively. Repeatability of the ACT was acceptable.

== Related tests ==
- Anti-factor Xa assay
- Bleeding time
- Coagulation factor assays
- Clot observation test
- D-dimer
- Ristocetin cofactor assay
- Thromboelastography
- Tourniquet test (Rumpel-Leede sign)
