= Bleeding diathesis =

High tendency to bleed due to a blood clotting disorder

- Other names: Haemorrhagic diathesis, Hemorrhagic diathesis
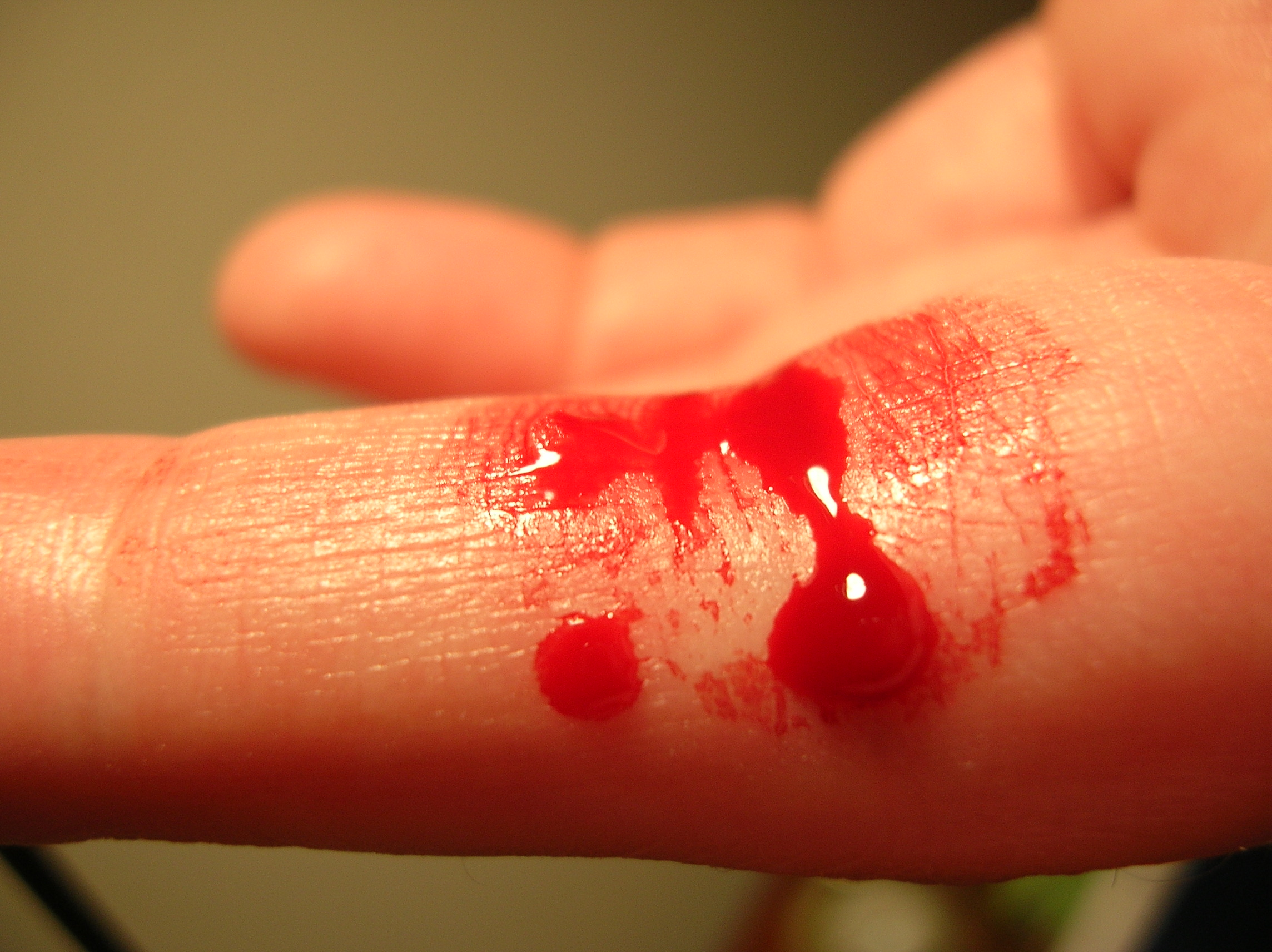
- A bleeding wound in the finger
- Specialty: Hematology

In medicine (hematology), bleeding diathesis is an unusual susceptibility to bleed (hemorrhage) mostly due to hypocoagulability (a condition of irregular and slow blood clotting), in turn caused by a coagulopathy (a defect in the system of coagulation). Therefore, this may result in the reduction of platelets being produced and leads to excessive bleeding. Several types of coagulopathy are distinguished, ranging from mild to lethal. Coagulopathy can be caused by thinning of the skin (Cushing's syndrome), such that the skin is weakened and is bruised easily and frequently without any trauma or injury to the body. Also, coagulopathy can be contributed by impaired wound healing or impaired clot formation.

== Signs and symptoms ==
Symptom	Disorders
Petechiae (red spots)	Wiskott–Aldrich syndrome, where they may resemble a few bruises; Acute leukemia; Chronic leukemia; Vitamin K deficiency
Purpura and ecchymoses	Acute leukemia; Chronic leukemia; Vitamin K deficiency
Blood in stool	Wiskott–Aldrich syndrome, especially in infancy; Acute leukemia
Bleeding gingiva (gums)	Wiskott–Aldrich syndrome; Acute leukemia; Chronic leukemia
Prolonged nose bleeds	Wiskott–Aldrich syndrome

=== Complications ===
Following are some complications of coagulopathies, some of them caused by their treatments:

Complication	Disorders
Soft tissue bleeding, e.g. deep-muscle bleeding, leading to swelling, numbness or pain of a limb.	Hemophilia; Von Willebrand disease
Joint damage, potentially with severe pain and even destruction of the joint and development of arthritis	Hemophilia; Von Willebrand disease
Retinal bleeding	Acute leukemia
Transfusion transmitted infection, from blood transfusions that are given as treatment.	Hemophilia
Adverse reactions to clotting factor treatment.	Hemophilia
Anemia	Von Willebrand disease
Exsanguination (bleeding to death)	Von Willebrand disease; Acute leukemia; Vitamin K deficiency
Cerebral hemorrhage	Wiskott–Aldrich syndrome

== Causes ==
While there are several possible causes, they generally result in excessive bleeding and a lack of clotting.

=== Acquired ===
Acquired causes of coagulopathy include anticoagulation with warfarin, liver failure, vitamin K deficiency and disseminated intravascular coagulation. Additionally, the hemotoxic venom from certain species of snakes can cause this condition, for example Bothrops, rattlesnakes and other species of viper. Viral hemorrhagic fevers include dengue hemorrhagic fever and dengue shock syndrome. Leukemia may also cause coagulopathy. Furthermore, cystic fibrosis has been known to cause bleeding diathesis, especially in undiagnosed infants, due to malabsorption of fat soluble vitamins like vitamin K.

=== Autoimmune causes of acquired coagulation disorders ===
There are autoimmune causes of coagulation disorders. They include acquired antibodies to coagulation factors, termed inhibitors of coagulation. The main inhibitor is directed against clotting factor VIII. Another example is antiphospholipid syndrome, an autoimmune, hypercoagulable state.

=== Causes other than coagulation ===
Bleeding diathesis may also be caused by impaired wound healing (as in scurvy), or by thinning of the skin, such as in Cushing's syndrome.

== Genetic ==
Some people lack genes that typically produce the protein coagulation factors that allow normal clotting. Various types of hemophilia and von Willebrand disease are the major genetic disorders associated with coagulopathy. Rare examples are Bernard–Soulier syndrome, Wiskott–Aldrich syndrome and Glanzmann's thrombasthenia. Gene therapy treatments may be a solution as they involve in the insertion of normal genes to replace defective genes causing for the genetic disorder. Gene therapy is a source of active research that hold promise for the future.

== Diagnosis ==
=== Comparing coagulation tests ===
Laboratory findings in various platelet and coagulation disorders
Condition	Prothrombin time	Partial thromboplastin time	Bleeding time	Platelet count
Vitamin K deficiency or warfarin	Prolonged	Normal or mildly prolonged	Unaffected	Unaffected
Disseminated intravascular coagulation	Prolonged	Prolonged	Prolonged	Decreased
Von Willebrand disease	Unaffected	Prolonged or unaffected	Prolonged	Unaffected
Hemophilia	Unaffected	Prolonged	Unaffected	Unaffected
Aspirin	Unaffected	Unaffected	Prolonged	Unaffected
Thrombocytopenia	Unaffected	Unaffected	Prolonged	Decreased
Liver failure, early	Prolonged	Unaffected	Unaffected	Unaffected
Liver failure, end-stage	Prolonged	Prolonged	Prolonged	Decreased
Uremia	Unaffected	Unaffected	Prolonged	Unaffected
Congenital afibrinogenemia	Prolonged	Prolonged	Prolonged	Unaffected
Factor V deficiency	Prolonged	Prolonged	Unaffected	Unaffected
Factor X deficiency as seen in amyloid purpura	Prolonged	Prolonged	Unaffected	Unaffected
Glanzmann's thrombasthenia	Unaffected	Unaffected	Prolonged	Unaffected
Bernard–Soulier syndrome	Unaffected	Unaffected	Prolonged	Decreased or unaffected
Factor XII deficiency	Unaffected	Prolonged	Unaffected	Unaffected
C1INH deficiency	Unaffected	Shortened	Unaffected	Unaffected

== Treatments ==
Consult a hematologist and have regular blood check ups. Have an early diagnostic test for any blood disorders or blood diseases including hemophilia, hemorrhage, and sickle-cell anemia. Prothrombin time and partial thromboplastin time blood tests are useful to investigate the reason behind the excessive bleeding. The PT evaluates coagulation factors I, II, V, VII and X, while the PTT evaluates coagulation factors I, II, V, VIII, IX, X, XI and XII. The analysis of both tests thus helps to diagnose certain disorders.

Blood transfusion involves the transfer of plasma containing all the necessary coagulating factors (fibrinogen, prothrombin, thromboplastin) to help restore them and to improve the immune defense of the patient after excessive blood loss. Blood transfusion also caused the transfer of platelets that can work along with coagulating factors for blood clotting to commence.

Different drugs can be prescribed depending on the type of disease. Vitamins (K, P and C) are essential in case of obstruction to walls of blood vessels. Also, vitamin K is required for the production of blood clotting factors, hence the injection of vitamin K (phytomenadione) is recommended to boost blood clotting.
