= Vonicog alfa =

Pharmaceutical drug

Clinical data
- Trade names: Vonvendi, Veyvondi
- Other names: BAX-111
- AHFS/Drugs.com: Monograph
- License data: US DailyMed: von willebrand factor
- Pregnancy category: AU: B2
- Routes of administration: Intravenous
- Drug class: Hemostatic
- ATC code: B02BD10 (WHO) B02BD06 (WHO)

Legal status
- Legal status: AU: S4 (Prescription only); CA: ℞-only / Schedule D; UK: POM (Prescription only); US: ℞-only; EU: Rx-only; In general: ℞ (Prescription only)

Identifiers
- CAS Number: 109319-16-6
- DrugBank: DB12872
- UNII: 5PKM8P0G5I
- KEGG: D08681

Chemical and physical data
- Formula: C_{9712}H_{15373}N_{2737}O_{3032}S_{210}
- Molar mass: 225725.54 g·mol^{−1}

Vonicog alfa, sold under the brand names Vonvendi and Veyvondi, is a medication used to control bleeding in adults with von Willebrand disease (an inherited bleeding disorder). It is a recombinant von Willebrand factor.

The most common adverse reactions are generalized itching, vomiting, nausea, dizziness, and vertigo.

Vonicog alfa should not be used in the treatment of Hemophilia A.

Vonicog alfa was approved for medical use in the United States in December 2015, in the European Union in August 2018, and in Australia in April 2020. It was granted orphan drug designations in both the United States and the European Union.

== Medical uses ==
In the EU, vonicog alfa is indicated in adults with von Willebrand Disease (VWD), when desmopressin (DDAVP) treatment alone is ineffective or not indicated for the treatment of hemorrhage and surgical bleeding; and the prevention of surgical bleeding.

In September 2025, the US Food and Drug Administration expanded the indication for von Willebrand factor (recombinant) for the routine preventative (prophylactic) use in adults with all types of von Willebrand disease and on-demand and treatment of bleeding episodes and perioperative use in children with von Willebrand disease. It is indicated in people with von Willebrand disease for the on-demand treatment and control of bleeding episodes; and for the perioperative management of bleeding. It is indicated in adults for the routine prophylaxis to reduce the frequency of bleeding episodes.

== Adverse effects ==
The following side effects may occur during treatment with vonicog alfa: hypersensitivity (allergic) reactions, thromboembolic events (problems due to the formation of blood clots in the blood vessels), development of inhibitors (antibodies) against von Willebrand factor, causing the medicine to stop working and resulting in a loss of bleeding control. The most common side effects with vonicog alfa (which may affect up to 1 in 10 patients) are dizziness, vertigo (a spinning sensation), dysgeusia (taste disturbances), tremor, rapid heartbeat, deep venous thrombosis (blood clot in a deep vein, usually in the leg), hypertension (high blood pressure), hot flush, vomiting, nausea (feeling sick), pruritus (itching), chest discomfort, sensations like numbness, tingling, pins and needles at the site of infusion, and an abnormal reading on the electrocardiogram (ECG).
