= GP1BA =

Protein-coding gene in the species Homo sapiens

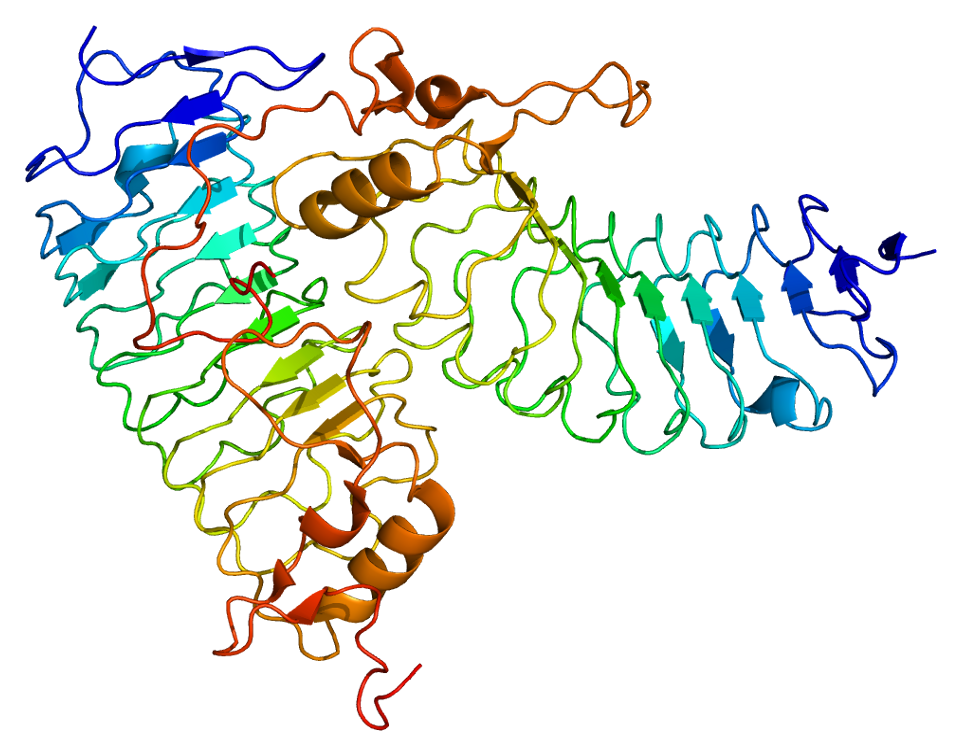

Identifiers
- Aliases: GP1BA, BDPLT1, BDPLT3, BSS, CD42B, CD42b-alpha, DBPLT3, GP1B, GPIbA, VWDP, GPIbalpha, glycoprotein Ib platelet alpha subunit, glycoprotein Ib platelet subunit alpha
- External IDs: OMIM: 606672; MGI: 1333744; GeneCards: GP1BA
Available structures
PDB	Ortholog search: PDBe RCSB
PDB	List of PDB id codes 1GWB, 1M0Z, 1M10, 1OOK, 1P8V, 1P9A, 1QYY, 1SQ0, 1U0N, 2BP3, 3P72, 3PMH, 4C2A, 4C2B, 4CH2, 4CH8, 4MGX, 4YR6

Gene location (Human)
Chr.	Chromosome 17 (human)
Band	17p13.2	Start	4,932,277 bp
Band	17p13.2	End	4,935,023 bp

Gene location (Mouse)
Chr.	Chromosome 11 (mouse)
Band	11 B3|11 43.2 cM	Start	70,529,948 bp
Band	11 B3|11 43.2 cM	End	70,532,862 bp
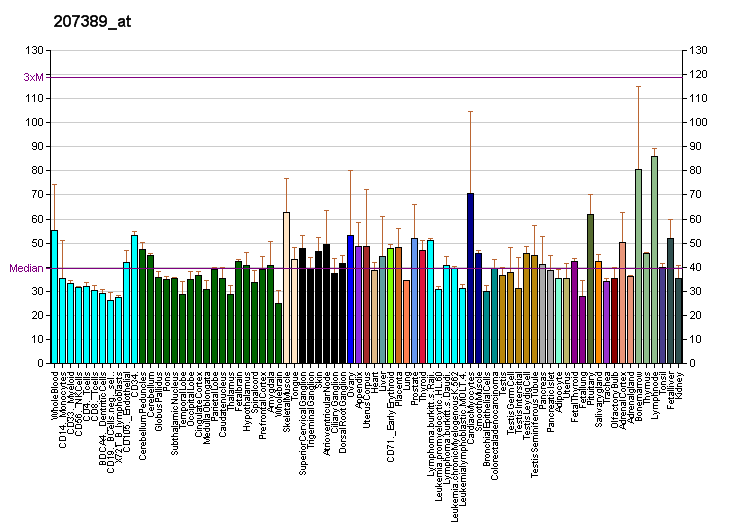
RNA expression pattern
Bgee	Human / Mouse (ortholog); Top expressed in: monocyte; lymph node; buccal mucosa cell; secondary oocyte; trabecular bone; granulocyte; blood; bone marrow cell; mucosa of ileum; tibialis anterior muscle / Top expressed in: blood; tibiofemoral joint; granulocyte; embryo; muscle of thigh; neural layer of retina; yolk sac; morula; spleen; lumbar subsegment of spinal cord; More reference expression data
BioGPS	More reference expression data
Gene ontology
Molecular function	protein kinase inhibitor activity; thrombin-activated receptor activity; protein binding
Cellular component	cytoplasm; integral component of membrane; membrane; plasma membrane; integral component of plasma membrane; cell surface; anchored component of external side of plasma membrane; extracellular exosome; extracellular space; extracellular matrix
Biological process	blood coagulation, intrinsic pathway; hemostasis; fibrinolysis; negative regulation of protein kinase activity; cytokine-mediated signaling pathway; blood coagulation; platelet activation; cell surface receptor signaling pathway; cell adhesion; cell morphogenesis; regulation of blood coagulation; negative regulation of receptor signaling pathway via JAK-STAT; thrombin-activated receptor signaling pathway; platelet aggregation; regulation of megakaryocyte differentiation
Sources:Amigo / QuickGO
Orthologs
Databases	NCBI: entry; OMA: entry
Species	Human	Mouse
Entrez	2811	14723
Ensembl	ENSG00000185245	ENSMUSG00000050675
UniProt	P07359	O35930
RefSeq (mRNA)	NM_000173	NM_010326
RefSeq (protein)	NP_000164	NP_034456
Location (UCSC)	Chr 17: 4.93 – 4.94 Mb	Chr 11: 70.53 – 70.53 Mb
PubMed search
- Wikidata
View/Edit Human	View/Edit Mouse

Platelet glycoprotein Ib alpha chain, also known as glycoprotein Ib (platelet), alpha polypeptide or CD42b (Cluster of Differentiation 42b), is a protein that in humans is encoded by the GP1BA gene.

== Function ==
Glycoprotein Ib (GP Ib) is a platelet surface membrane glycoprotein receptor composed of a heterodimer, an alpha chain and a beta chain, that are linked by disulfide bonds. The Gp Ib functions as a receptor for von Willebrand factor (VWF). The complete receptor complex includes noncovalent association of the alpha and beta subunits with platelet glycoprotein IX and platelet glycoprotein V to form the glycoprotein Ib-IX-V complex. Binding of the GP Ib-IX-V complex to VWF facilitates initial platelet adhesion to vascular subendothelium after vascular injury, and also initiates signaling events within the platelet that lead to enhanced platelet activation, thrombosis, and hemostasis. This gene encodes the alpha subunit. Several polymorphisms and mutations have been described in this gene, some of which are the cause of Bernard–Soulier syndromes and platelet-type von Willebrand disease.

== Interactions ==
GP1BA has been shown to interact with YWHAZ and FLNB.

== Inhibitors ==
CCP-224, a short PEG-conjugated form of the cyclic peptide OS-1, binds to human GPIb alpha with high affinity and can prevents neutrophil-platelet aggregation in Sickle Cell Disease. CCP-224 and other conjugated forms of OS-1 have been developed by Gray Shaw at Quell Pharma LLC.In vivo, platelet-mediated thrombus formation can be greatly reduced in arterioles of mice, injured by laser, following an infusion of the OS-1 peptide. The OS-1 peptide prevents binding of GPIb alpha to the VWF A1 domain. The co-crystal structure of GPIb alpha and OS-1 has been reported.

== See also ==
- Cluster of differentiation
