= Clot retraction =

Shrinking of a blood clot

Clot retraction is the "shrinking" of a blood clot over a number of days. In doing so, the edges of the blood vessel wall at the point of injury are slowly brought together again to repair the damage that occurred.

Clot retraction is dependent on the release of multiple coagulation factors from platelets trapped in the fibrin mesh of the clot. Thus, failure to retract can be a sign of thrombocytopenia or a rare condition called thrombasthenia. Blood clot prevention can be of use before this condition develops.
