= Glycoprotein Ib =

Protein found in platelets

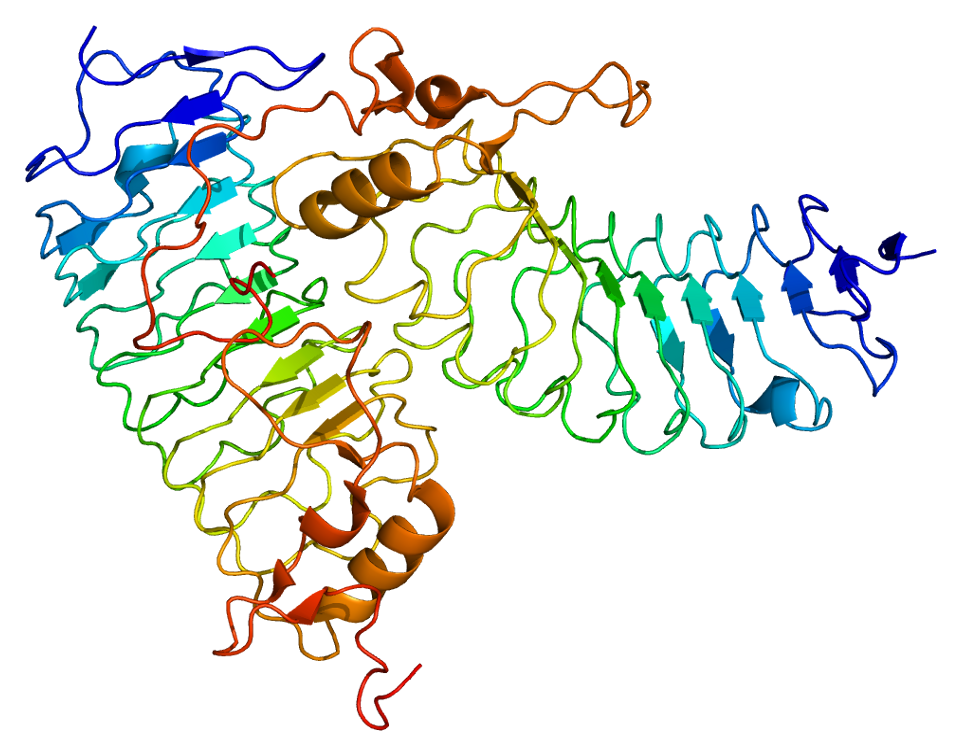

Glycoprotein Ib (GPIb), also known as CD42, is a component of the GPIb-V-IX complex on platelets. The GPIb-V-IX complex binds von Willebrand factor, allowing platelet adhesion and platelet plug formation at sites of vascular injury. Glycoprotein Ibα (GPIbα) is the major ligand-binding subunit of the GPIb-V-IX complex. GPIbα is heavily glycosylated.

It is deficient in the Bernard–Soulier syndrome. A gain-of-function mutation causes platelet-type von Willebrand disease.

Autoantibodies against Ib/IX can be produced in immune thrombocytopenic purpura.

Components include GP1BA and GP1BB.

It complexes with Glycoprotein IX.
