= Heyde's syndrome =

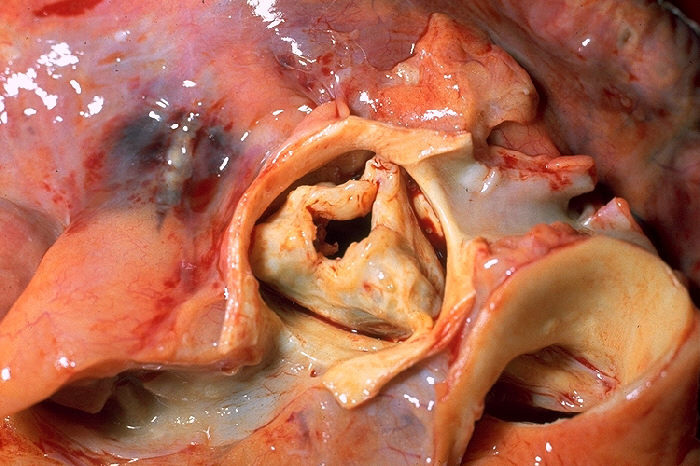
- A stenotic aortic valve
- Specialty: Cardiology, general surgery, Hematology
- Symptoms: Aortic valve stenosis symptoms: Chest pain (angina) or tightness Shortness of breath, especially during exertion or when lying down Fatigue or weakness Irregular heartbeat or heart palpitations Dizziness or fainting episodes Gastrointestinal bleeding symptoms: Occult (hidden) or overt (visible) blood in the stool Black, tarry stools (melena) Blood in vomit (hematemesis) Fatigue or weakness due to chronic blood loss Anemia (low red blood cell count)
- Complications: Gastrointestinal bleeding, Iron-deficiency anemia, Cardiovascular complications, Thromboembolic events, and Endocarditis.
- Usual onset: Uncommon.
- Duration: 23.8±39 months.
- Types: Aortic stenosis, gastrointestinal angiodysplasia, and acquired von Willebrand disorder.
- Causes: Deficiency of high-molecular-weight multimers of von Willebrand factor.
- Risk factors: Recurrent gastrointestinal bleeding and heart failure.
- Diagnostic method: CBC, coagulation studies, metabolic panel, and test for fecal occult blood.
- Differential diagnosis: Aortic stenosis, gastrointestinal bleeding, and evidence that supports the presence of AVWS (Acquired von Willebrand syndrome).
- Prevention: Unknown.
- Treatment: Aortic valve replacement, medical therapy, endoscopic interventions, and colonic surgery.
- Medication: None.
- Prognosis: Excellent in patients who undergo aortic valve replacement, which is both effective and often curative.
- Frequency: 7.5% of persons 75 years of age or older.
- Deaths: 29.16% (from 48 to 62 per 100,000) and 22.7% (from 3.7 to 4.54 per 100,000) from 2007 to 2014.

Heyde's syndrome is a syndrome of gastrointestinal bleeding from angiodysplasia in the presence of aortic stenosis.

It is named after Edward C. Heyde, MD, who first noted the association in 1958. It is caused by cleavage of Von Willebrand factor (vWF) due to high shear stress forces from aortic valvular stenosis. This results in Von Willebrand disease type IIA (acquired).

== Pathophysiology ==
Pathophysiology of Heyde's Syndrome a. von Willebrand Factor (vWF) passes through a normal aortic valve and remains in its coiled form. b. vWF passes through a stenotic aortic valve and uncoils. c. Coiled vWF is unaffected by the catabolic enzyme ADAMTS13. d. Uncoiled vWF is cleaved in two by ADAMTS13. e. In damaged arterioles vWF uncoils and becomes active. It binds collagen, platelets bind to vWF, and a clot forms. f. Inactive vWF cannot bind to the collagen, no clot forms.

Von Willebrand factor is synthesized in the walls of the blood vessels and circulates freely in the blood in a folded form. When it encounters damage to the wall of a blood vessel, particularly in situations of high velocity blood flow, it binds to the collagen beneath the damaged endothelium and uncoils into its active form. Platelets are attracted to this activated form of von Willebrand factor and they accumulate and block the damaged area, preventing bleeding.

In people with aortic valve stenosis, the stenotic aortic valve becomes increasingly narrowed resulting in an increase in speed of the blood through the valve in order to maintain cardiac output. This combination of a narrow opening and a higher flow rate results in an increased shear stress on the blood. This higher stress causes von Willebrand factor to unravel in the same way it would on encountering an injury site. As part of the normal hemostasis of the blood, when von Willebrand factor changes conformation into its active state, it is degraded by its natural catabolic enzyme ADAMTS13, rendering it incapable of binding the collagen at an injury site. As the quantity of von Willebrand factor in the blood decreases, the rate of bleeding dramatically increases.

The unraveling of high molecular weight von Willebrand factor in conditions of high shear stress is essential in the prevention of bleeding in the vasculature of the gastrointestinal system where small arterioles are common, as platelets cannot bind to damaged blood vessel walls well in such conditions. This is particularly true in the presence of intestinal angiodysplasia, where arteriovenous malformations lead to very high blood flow, and so the loss of von Willebrand factor can lead to much more extensive bleeding from these lesions. When people with aortic stenosis also have gastrointestinal bleeding, it is invariably from angiodysplasia.

It has been hypothesized that defects in high molecular weight von Willebrand factor could actually be the cause of the arteriovenus malformations in intestinal angiodysplasia, rather than just making existing angiodysplasic lesions bleed. This hypothesis is complicated by the extremely high rates of intestinal angiodysplasia in older people (who also have the highest rate of aortic stenosis), and thus requires further research for confirmation.

== Diagnosis ==
Heyde's syndrome is now known to be gastrointestinal bleeding from angiodysplasic lesions due to acquired vWD-2A deficiency secondary to aortic stenosis, and the diagnosis is made by confirming the presence of those three things. Gastrointestinal bleeding may present as bloody vomit, dark, tarry stool from metabolized blood, or fresh blood in the stool. In a person presenting with these symptoms, endoscopy, gastroscopy, and/or colonoscopy should be performed to confirm the presence of angiodysplasia. Aortic stenosis can be diagnosed by auscultation for characteristic heart sounds, particularly a crescendo-decrescendo (i.e., 'ejection') murmur, followed by echocardiography to measure aortic valve area (see diagnosis of aortic stenosis). While Heyde's syndrome may exist alone with no other symptoms of aortic stenosis, the person could also present with evidence of heart failure, fainting, or chest pain. Finally, Heyde's syndrome can be confirmed using blood tests for vWD-2A, although traditional blood tests for von Willebrand factor may result in false negatives due to the subtlety of the abnormality. The gold standard for diagnosis is gel electrophoresis; in people with vWD-2A, the large molecular weight von Willebrand factors will be absent from the SDS-agarose electrophoresis plate.

== Management ==
The definitive treatment for Heyde's syndrome is surgical replacement of the aortic valve. Recently, it has been proposed that transcatheter aortic valve implantation (TAVI) can also be used for definitive management. Direct surgical treatment of the bleeding (e.g. surgical resection of the bleeding portion of the bowel) is only rarely effective.

Medical management of symptoms is possible also, although by necessity temporary, as definitive surgical management is required to bring levels of von Willebrand factor back to normal. In severe bleeding, blood transfusions and IV fluid infusions can be used to maintain blood pressure. In addition, desmopressin (DDAVP) is known to be effective in people with von Willebrand's disease, including people with valvular heart disease. Desmopressin stimulates release of von Willebrand factor from blood vessel endothelial cells by acting on the V2 receptor, which leads to decreased breakdown of Factor VIII. Desmopressin is thus sometimes used directly to treat mild to moderate acquired von Willebrand's disease and is an effective prophylactic agent for the reduction of bleeding during heart valve replacement surgery.

== Epidemiology ==
The exact prevalence of the syndrome is unknown, because both aortic stenosis and angiodysplasia are common diseases in the elderly. A retrospective chart review of 3.8 million people in Northern Ireland found that the incidence of gastrointestinal bleeding in people with any diagnosis of aortic stenosis (they did not subgroup people by severity) was just 0.9%. They also found that the reverse correlation—the incidence of aortic stenosis in people with gastrointestinal bleeding—was 1.5%. However, in 2003 a study of 50 people with aortic stenosis severe enough to warrant immediate valve replacement found GI bleeding in 21% of people, and another study done in the USA looking at angiodysplasia rather than GI bleeding found that the prevalence of aortic stenosis was 31% compared to 14% in the control group. It is a disease mainly found in older adults but a rare case of Heyde's syndrome has been reported in children.

== History ==
The American internist Edward C. Heyde originally described the syndrome in a 1958 letter to the New England Journal of Medicine, reporting on ten patients with the association. Heyde graduated from Johns Hopkins School of Medicine in 1938, served three years in the Army Medical Corps in World War II and joined the Vancouver Clinic, Vancouver, Washington in 1948, practicing medicine there for 31 years. He died on October 13, 2004.

In the 45 years following its initial description, no plausible explanations could be found for the association between aortic valve stenosis and gastrointestinal bleeding. Indeed, the association itself was questioned by a number of researchers. Several studies demonstrated a statistically significant association between aortic stenosis and gastrointestinal bleeding, and in 1987 King et al. even noted the successful resolution of bleeding symptoms with aortic valve replacement in 93% of people, compared to just 5% in people where the bleeding was treated surgically. However, the potential causal association between the two conditions remained elusive and controversial.

Several hypotheses for the association were proposed, the most prominent being the idea that there is no causal relationship between aortic stenosis and gastrointestinal bleeding, they are both just common conditions in the elderly, and they sometimes overlap. Other hypotheses included hypoxia of the colonic mucosa and bowel ischemia due to low blood flow, both of which were discounted by later research. Another early hypothesis of note was proposed by Greenstein et al. in 1986. They suggested that GI bleeding could be caused by thinning of the wall of the cecum due to abnormal pulse waves in the ileocolic artery (an artery that supplies blood to the cecum) causing dilation of that artery. Specifically, they note that the usual anacrotic and dicrotic notches were absent from the pulse waves of their people with aortic stenosis. There has been no further research investigating this hypothesis, however, as it has been eclipsed by newer research into acquired von Willebrand's disease.

The important role of depletion of von Willebrand factor in aortic stenosis was first proposed in 1992 by Warkentin et al. They noted a known association between aortic stenosis (in addition to other cardiac diseases) and acquired von Willebrand's disease type IIA, which is corrected by surgical replacement of the aortic valve. They also noted that von Willebrand's disease is known to cause bleeding from angiodysplasia. Based on these facts, they hypothesized that acquired von Willebrand's disease is the true culprit behind gastrointestinal bleeding in aortic stenosis. They also proposed a possible mechanism for the acquired von Willebrand's disease, noting that von Willebrand factor is most active in 'high shear' vessels (meaning small vessels in which blood flows rapidly). They used this fact to hypothesize that this may mean that von Willebrand factor is activated in the narrowed stenotic aortic valve and thus cleared from circulation at a much higher rate than in healthy individuals.

This hypothesis received strong support in 2003 by the publication of a report by Vincentelli et al. that demonstrated a strong association between von Willebrand factor defects and the severity of aortic valve stenosis. They also showed these defects resolved within hours following aortic valve replacement surgery and remained resolved in most people, although in some people the von Willebrand factor defects had returned at six months. Following this observation the shear stress dependent depletion of von Willebrand factor was confirmed, and the protease responsible, ADAMTS13, was identified.
