= GP1BB =

Protein-coding gene in the species Homo sapiens

Identifiers
- Aliases: GP1BB, BDPLT1, BS, CD42C, GPIBB, GPIbbeta, glycoprotein Ib platelet beta subunit, glycoprotein Ib platelet subunit beta
- External IDs: OMIM: 138720; MGI: 107852; GeneCards: GP1BB
Available structures
PDB	Ortholog search: PDBe RCSB
PDB	List of PDB id codes 3REZ, 3RFE

Gene location (Human)
Chr.	Chromosome 22 (human)
Band	22q11.21	Start	19,723,539 bp
Band	22q11.21	End	19,724,771 bp

Gene location (Mouse)
Chr.	Chromosome 16 (mouse)
Band	16 A3|16 11.53 cM	Start	18,439,067 bp
Band	16 A3|16 11.53 cM	End	18,441,153 bp
RNA expression pattern
Bgee	Human / Mouse (ortholog); Top expressed in: monocyte; granulocyte; blood; primary visual cortex; gonad; olfactory zone of nasal mucosa; bone marrow cell; spleen; superior frontal gyrus; sural nerve / Top expressed in: ileum; spleen; jejunum; bone marrow; ganglionic eminence; neural tube; mesencephalon; striatum of neuraxis; vasculature; embryo; More reference expression data
BioGPS	n/a
Gene ontology
Molecular function	protein binding; transmembrane signaling receptor activity; identical protein binding
Cellular component	integral component of membrane; plasma membrane; integral component of plasma membrane; membrane
Biological process	platelet activation; blood coagulation, intrinsic pathway; hemostasis; cell surface receptor signaling pathway; cell adhesion; blood coagulation
Sources:Amigo / QuickGO
Orthologs
Databases	NCBI: entry; OMA: entry
Species	Human	Mouse
Entrez	2812	14724
Ensembl	ENSG00000203618	ENSMUSG00000050761
UniProt	P13224	P56400
RefSeq (mRNA)	NM_000407	NM_001001999; NM_010327
RefSeq (protein)	NP_000398	NP_001001999; NP_034457
Location (UCSC)	Chr 22: 19.72 – 19.72 Mb	Chr 16: 18.44 – 18.44 Mb
PubMed search
- Wikidata
View/Edit Human	View/Edit Mouse

Glycoprotein Ib (platelet), beta polypeptide (GP1BB) also known as CD42c (Cluster of Differentiation 42c), is a protein that in humans is encoded by the GP1BB gene.

== Function ==
Platelet glycoprotein Ib (GPIb) is a heterodimeric transmembrane protein consisting of a disulfide-linked 140 kD alpha chain and 22 kD beta chain. It is part of the Glycoprotein Ib-IX-V Receptor Complex (GPIb-V-IX) system that constitutes the receptor for von Willebrand factor (VWF), and mediates platelet adhesion in the arterial circulation. GPIb alpha chain provides the VWF binding site, and GPIb beta contributes to surface expression of the receptor and participates in transmembrane signaling through phosphorylation of its intracellular domain. Mutations in the GPIb beta subunit have been associated with Bernard–Soulier syndrome, velocardiofacial syndrome and giant platelet disorder. The 206 amino acid precursor of GPIb beta is synthesized from a 1.0 kb mRNA expressed in plateletes and megakaryocytes. A 411 amino acid protein arising from a longer, unspliced transcript in endothelial cells has been described; however, the authenticity of this product has been questioned. Yet another less abundant GPIb beta mRNA species of 3.5 kb, expressed in nonhematopoietic tissues such as endothelium, brain and heart, was shown to result from inefficient usage of a non-consensus polyA signal within a separate gene (septin 5) located upstream of this gene. In the absence of polyadenylation from its own imperfect site, the septin 5 gene uses the consensus polyA signal of this gene.

== Interactions ==
GP1BB has been shown to interact with YWHAZ.

== See also ==
- Cluster of differentiation
