= Bleeding time =

Medical test for assessing blood coagulation function

- Specialty: Haematology
- MeSH: D001760
- MedlinePlus: 003656

Bleeding time is a medical test done to assess the function of a person's platelets. It involves making a patient bleed, then timing how long it takes for them to stop bleeding using a stopwatch or other suitable devices.

The term template bleeding time is used when the test is performed to standardized parameters.

A newer alternative to the traditional bleeding time test is the platelet function screen performed on the PFA-100 analyzer.

== Usage ==
The template bleeding time test is a method used when other more reliable and less invasive tests for determining coagulation are not available. Historically, it was used whenever physicians needed information about platelet activation.

== Process ==
The test involves cutting the underside of the subject's forearm, in an area where there is no hair or visible veins. The cut is of a standardized width and depth, and is done quickly by a template device.

=== IVY method ===
The IVY method is the traditional format for this test. While both the IVY and Duke's method require the use of a sphygmomanometer, or blood pressure cuff, the IVY method is more invasive than the Duke method, utilizing an incision on the ventral side of the forearm, whereas the Duke method involves puncture with a lancet or special needle. In the IVY method, the blood pressure cuff is placed on the upper arm and inflated to 40 mmHg. A lancet or scalpel blade is used to make a shallow incision that is 1 millimeter deep on the underside of the forearm.

A standard-sized incision is made around 10 mm long and 1 mm deep. The time from when the incision is made until all bleeding has stopped is measured and is called the bleeding time. Every 30 seconds, filter paper or a paper towel is used to draw off the blood.

The test is finished when bleeding has stopped.

A prolonged bleeding time may be a result from decreased number of thrombocytes or impaired blood vessels. However, the depth of the puncture or incision may be the source of error.

Normal values fall between 3 – 10 minutes depending on the method used.

A disadvantage of Ivy's method is closure of puncture wound before stoppage of bleeding.

=== Duke's method ===
With the Duke's method, the patient is pricked with a special needle or lancet, preferably on the earlobe or fingertip, after having been swabbed with alcohol. The prick is about 3–4 mm deep. The patient then wipes the blood every 30 seconds with a filter paper. The test ceases when bleeding ceases. The usual time is about 2–5 minutes.

This method is not recommended and cannot be standardized because it can cause a large local hematoma.

== Interpretation ==
Bleeding time may be affected by platelet function, certain vascular disorders and von Willebrand Disease—not by other coagulation factors such as haemophilia. Diseases that may cause prolonged bleeding time include thrombocytopenia, disseminated intravascular coagulation (DIC), Bernard-Soulier disease, and Glanzmann's thrombasthenia.

Aspirin and other cyclooxygenase inhibitors can significantly prolong bleeding time. While warfarin and heparin have their major effects on coagulation factors, an increased bleeding time is sometimes seen with use of these medications as well.

People with von Willebrand disease usually experience increased bleeding time, as von Willebrand factor is a platelet adhesion protein, but this is not considered an effective diagnostic test for this condition.

It is also prolonged in hypofibrinogenemia.

== In popular culture ==
In the British comedy film Doctor in the House (1954), Sir Lancelot Spratt, the intimidating chief of surgery played by James Robertson Justice is asking instructional questions of his medical students. He asks a young student, who has been distracted by a pretty nurse, what "the bleeding time" is. The student looks at his watch and answers "Ten past ten, sir."
