= Glycoprotein IX =

Protein-coding gene in the species Homo sapiens

GP9

Identifiers
- Aliases: GP9, CD42a, GPIX, Glycoprotein IX, glycoprotein IX platelet
- External IDs: OMIM: 173515; MGI: 1860137; GeneCards: GP9
Available structures
PDB	Ortholog search: PDBe RCSB
PDB	List of PDB id codes 3REZ

Gene location (Human)
Chr.	Chromosome 3 (human)
Band	3q21.3	Start	129,060,779 bp
Band	3q21.3	End	129,062,406 bp

Gene location (Mouse)
Chr.	Chromosome 6 (mouse)
Band	6 D1|6 39.13 cM	Start	87,755,054 bp
Band	6 D1|6 39.13 cM	End	87,756,750 bp
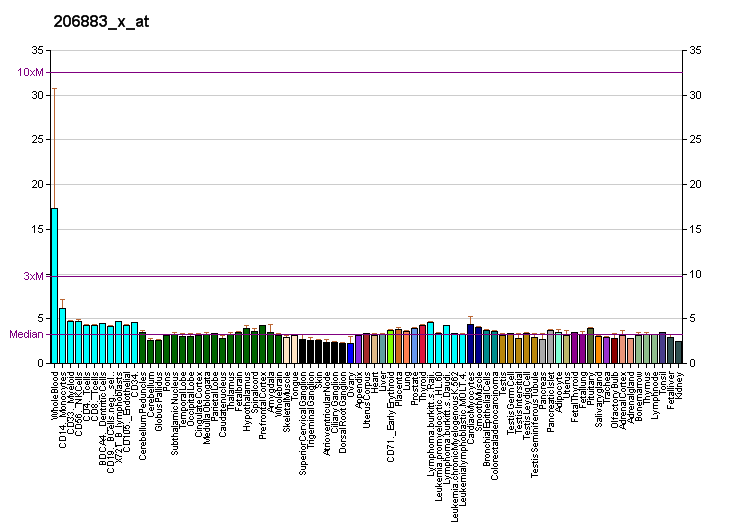
RNA expression pattern
Bgee	Human / Mouse (ortholog); Top expressed in: monocyte; granulocyte; blood; right lung; spleen; bone marrow; upper lobe of left lung; bone marrow cell; mucosa of nose; olfactory zone of nasal mucosa / Top expressed in: blood; fetal liver hematopoietic progenitor cell; tibiofemoral joint; spleen; embryo; granulocyte; morula; yolk sac; right lung; morula; More reference expression data
BioGPS	More reference expression data
Gene ontology
Molecular function	protein binding
Cellular component	integral component of membrane; plasma membrane; integral component of plasma membrane; membrane
Biological process	platelet activation; blood coagulation, intrinsic pathway; hemostasis; cell adhesion; blood coagulation
Sources:Amigo / QuickGO
Orthologs
Databases	NCBI: entry; OMA: entry
Species	Human	Mouse
Entrez	2815	54368
Ensembl	ENSG00000169704	ENSMUSG00000030054
UniProt	P14770	O88186
RefSeq (mRNA)	NM_000174	NM_018762
RefSeq (protein)	NP_000165	NP_061232
Location (UCSC)	Chr 3: 129.06 – 129.06 Mb	Chr 6: 87.76 – 87.76 Mb
PubMed search
- Wikidata
View/Edit Human	View/Edit Mouse

Glycoprotein IX (platelet) (GP9) also known as CD42a (Cluster of Differentiation 42a), is a human gene.

Platelet glycoprotein IX (GP9) is a small membrane glycoprotein found on the surface of human platelets. It forms a 1-to-1 noncovalent complex with glycoprotein Ib (GP Ib), a platelet surface membrane glycoprotein complex that functions as a receptor for von Willebrand factor (VWF; MIM 193400) (known as the Glycoprotein Ib-IX-V Receptor Complex). The main portion of the receptor is a heterodimer composed of 2 polypeptide chains, an alpha chain (GP1BA; MIM 606672) and a beta chain (GP1BB; MIM 138720), that are linked by disulfide bonds. The complete receptor complex includes noncovalent association of the alpha and beta subunits with GP9 and platelet glycoprotein V (GP5; MIM 173511).[supplied by OMIM]

== See also ==
- Cluster of differentiation
