= Ristocetin =

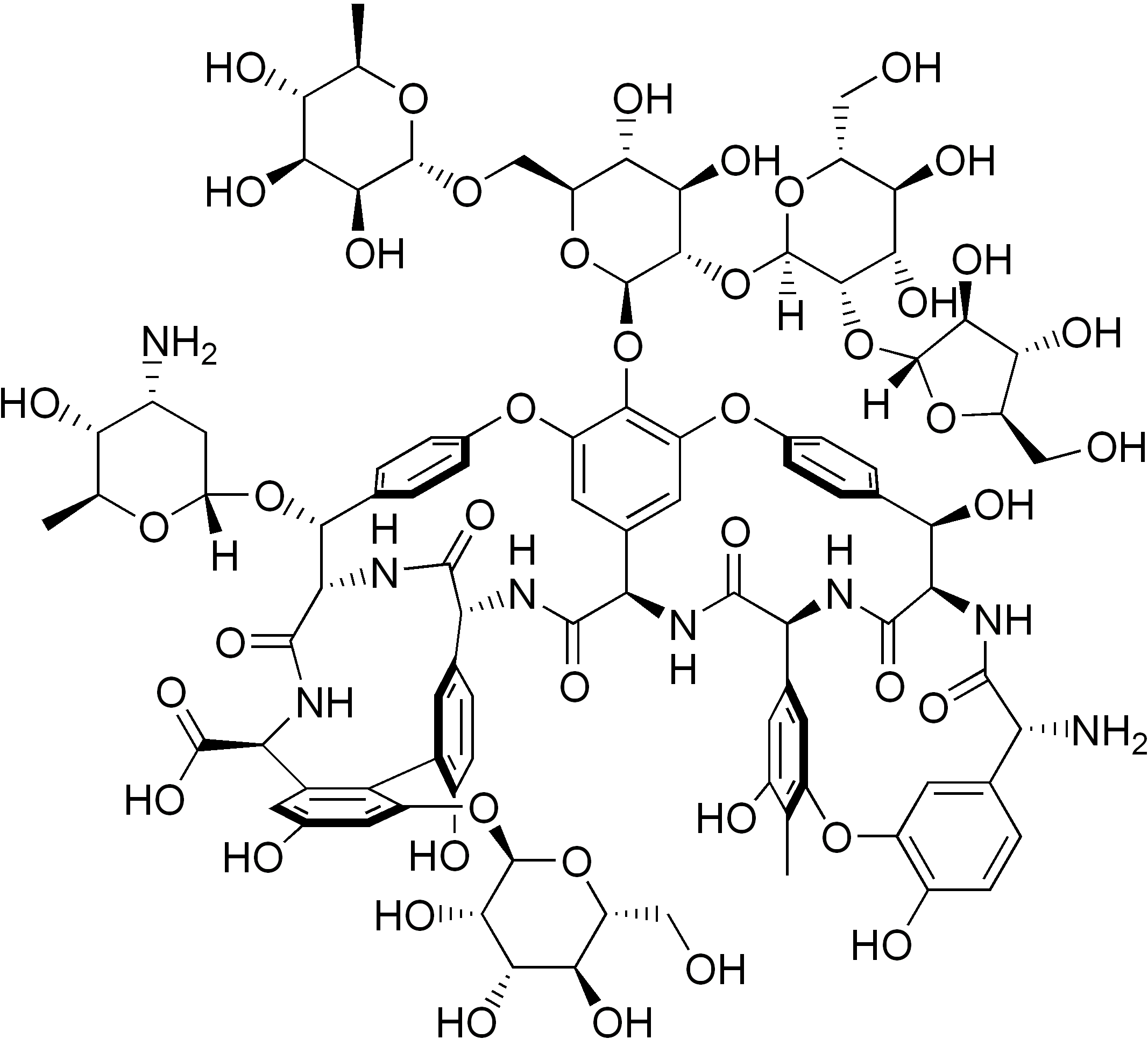

Identifiers
CAS Number	1404-55-3
3D model (JSmol)	Interactive image
ChEMBL	ChEMBL1095986
ChemSpider	21106475
ECHA InfoCard	100.014.336
PubChem CID	24846002
UNII	ZP3E6S00IL
CompTox Dashboard (EPA)	DTXSID30894853
- InChI: InChI=1S/C98H113N7O43/c1-30-50(111)20-39-22-54(30)138-55-21-33(5-12-49(55)110)63(100)88(127)105-67-70(115)35-7-13-52-37(15-35)18-44-62-45-19-38-16-36(8-14-53(38)140-84(45)87(83(44)139-52)148-98-86(78(123)74(119)59(144-98)29-135-94-80(125)75(120)69(114)32(3)137-94)147-97-85(77(122)73(118)58(27-107)143-97)146-95-79(124)71(116)51(112)28-134-95)82(145-60-25-46(99)68(113)31(2)136-60)47-10-9-41(93(132)133-4)42-23-40(108)24-56(141-96-81(126)76(121)72(117)57(26-106)142-96)61(42)43-17-34(6-11-48(43)109)64(89(128)101-47)102-91(130)66(62)104-90(129)65(39)103-92(67)131/h5-8,11-17,20-24,31-32,41,46-47,51,57-60,63-82,85-86,94-98,106-126H,9-10,18-19,25-29,99-100H2,1-4H3,(H,101,128)(H,102,130)(H,103,131)(H,104,129)(H,105,127)/t31-,32+,41-,46+,47?,51-,57+,58-,59-,60+,63?,64?,65?,66?,67+,68-,69+,70+,71-,72+,73-,74-,75-,76-,77+,78+,79+,80-,81-,82+,85+,86-,94-,95+,96+,97-,98+/m0/s1 Key: SGAHMTIMAXYJKX-JWVHJGEPSA-N; InChI=1/C98H113N7O43/c1-30-50(111)20-39-22-54(30)138-55-21-33(5-12-49(55)110)63(100)88(127)105-67-70(115)35-7-13-52-37(15-35)18-44-62-45-19-38-16-36(8-14-53(38)140-84(45)87(83(44)139-52)148-98-86(78(123)74(119)59(144-98)29-135-94-80(125)75(120)69(114)32(3)137-94)147-97-85(77(122)73(118)58(27-107)143-97)146-95-79(124)71(116)51(112)28-134-95)82(145-60-25-46(99)68(113)31(2)136-60)47-10-9-41(93(132)133-4)42-23-40(108)24-56(141-96-81(126)76(121)72(117)57(26-106)142-96)61(42)43-17-34(6-11-48(43)109)64(89(128)101-47)102-91(130)66(62)104-90(129)65(39)103-92(67)131/h5-8,11-17,20-24,31-32,41,46-47,51,57-60,63-82,85-86,94-98,106-126H,9-10,18-19,25-29,99-100H2,1-4H3,(H,101,128)(H,102,130)(H,103,131)(H,104,129)(H,105,127)/t31-,32+,41-,46+,47?,51-,57+,58-,59-,60+,63?,64?,65?,66?,67+,68-,69+,70+,71-,72+,73-,74-,75-,76-,77+,78+,79+,80-,81-,82+,85+,86-,94-,95+,96+,97-,98+/m0/s1 Key: SGAHMTIMAXYJKX-JWVHJGEPBW
- SMILES: CC1C(C(CC(O1)OC2C3C(=O)NC(C4=CC(=CC(=C4C5=C(C=CC(=C5)C(C(=O)N3)NC(=O)C6C7=CC(=C(C(=C7)OC8=CC=C2C=C8)OC9C(C(C(C(O9)COC1C(C(C(C(O1)C)O)O)O)O)O)OC1C(C(C(C(O1)CO)O)O)OC1C(C(C(CO1)O)O)O)OC1=CC=C(C=C1)C(C1C(=O)NC(C2=CC(=C(C(=C2)O)C)OC2=C(C=CC(=C2)C(C(=O)N1)N)O)C(=O)N6)O)O)OC1C(C(C(C(O1)CO)O)O)O)O)C(=O)O)N)O

Properties
Chemical formula	C_{94}H_{108}N_{8}O_{44}
Molar mass	2053.89052
- Except where otherwise noted, data are given for materials in their standard state (at 25 °C [77 °F], 100 kPa). verify (what is ?) Infobox references

Ristocetin is a glycopeptide antibiotic, obtained from Amycolatopsis lurida, previously used to treat staphylococcal infections. It is no longer used clinically because it caused thrombocytopenia and platelet agglutination. It is now used solely to assay those functions in vitro in the diagnosis of conditions such as von Willebrand disease (vWD) and Bernard–Soulier syndrome. Platelet agglutination caused by ristocetin can occur only in the presence of von Willebrand factor multimers, so if ristocetin is added to blood lacking the factor (or its receptor—see below), the platelets will not clump.

Through an unknown mechanism, the antibiotic ristocetin causes von Willebrand factor to bind the platelet receptor glycoprotein Ib (GpIb), so when ristocetin is added to normal blood, it causes agglutination.

In some types of vWD (types 2B and platelet-type), even very small amounts of ristocetin cause platelet aggregation when the patient's platelet-rich plasma is used. This paradox is explained by these types having gain-of-function mutations which cause the vWD high molecular-weight multimers to bind more tightly to their receptors on platelets (the alpha chains of glycoprotein Ib (GPIb) receptors). In the case of type 2B vWD, the gain-of-function mutation involves von Willebrand's factor (VWF gene), and in platelet-type vWD, the receptor is the object of the mutation (GPIb). This increased binding causes vWD because the high-molecular weight multimers are removed from circulation in plasma since they remain attached to the patient's platelets. Thus, if the patient's platelet-poor plasma is used, the ristocetin cofactor assay will not agglutinate standardized platelets (i.e., pooled platelets from normal donors that are fixed in formalin), similar to the other types of vWD.

In all forms of the ristocetin assay, the platelets are fixed in formalin prior to the assay to prevent von Willebrand's factor stored in platelet granules from being released and participating in platelet aggregation. Thus, the ristocetin cofactor activity depends only upon high-molecular multimers of the factor present in circulating plasma.

Platelet aggregation function by main disorders and agonists
	ADP	Epinephrine	Collagen	Ristocetin
P2Y receptor inhibitor or defect	Decreased	Normal	Normal	Normal
Adrenergic receptor defect	Normal	Decreased	Normal	Normal
Collagen receptor defect	Normal	Normal	Decreased or absent	Normal
Von Willebrand disease (except Type 2B); Bernard–Soulier syndrome	Normal	Normal	Normal	Decreased or absent
Glanzmann's thrombasthenia	Decreased	Decreased	Decreased	Normal or decreased
