= Amyloid purpura =

- Purpura
- Specialty: Dermatology

Amyloid purpura is a condition marked by bleeding under the skin (purpura) in some individuals with amyloidosis. Its cause is unknown, but coagulation defects caused by amyloid are thought to contribute.

== Presentation ==
Amyloid purpura usually occurs above the nipple-line and is found in the webbing of the neck and in the face and eyelids.

== Cause ==
The precise cause of amyloid purpura is unknown, but several mechanisms are thought to contribute. One may be a decrease in the level of circulating factor X, a clotting factor necessary for coagulation. The proposed mechanism for this decrease in factor X is that circulating amyloid fibrils bind and inactivate factor X. Another contributing factor may be enhanced fibrinolysis, the breakdown of clots. Subendothelial deposits of amyloid may weaken blood vessels and lead to the extravasation of blood. Amyloid deposits in the gastrointestinal tract and liver may also play a role in the development of amyloid purpura.

== Epidemiology ==
Amyloid purpura affects a minority of individuals with amyloidosis. For example, purpura is present early in the disease in approximately 15% of patients with primary systemic amyloidosis.
