= Bernard–Soulier syndrome =

Bernard-Soulier syndrome
- Other names: Hemorrhagiparous thrombocytic dystrophy
- Bernard-Soulier syndrome has an autosomal recessive pattern of inheritance (rarely autosomal dominant).
- Specialty: Hematology
- Causes: Mutations in GP1BA, GP1BB and GP9
- Diagnostic method: Flow cytometry analysis
- Treatment: Platelet transfusion

Bernard–Soulier syndrome (BSS) is a rare autosomal recessive bleeding disorder that is caused by a deficiency of the glycoprotein Ib-IX-V complex (GPIb-IX-V), the receptor for von Willebrand factor. The incidence of BSS is estimated to be less than 1 case per million persons, based on cases reported from Europe, North America, and Japan. BSS is a giant platelet disorder, meaning that it is characterized by abnormally large platelets.

== Signs and symptoms ==
Bernard–Soulier syndrome often presents as a bleeding disorder with symptoms of:

- Perioperative (and postoperative) bleeding
- Bleeding gums
- Bruising
- Epistaxis (nosebleeds)
- Abnormal bleeding (from small injuries)
- Unusual menstrual periods

== Genetics ==
In regards to mechanism, there are three genes, GP1BA, GP1BB and GP9 that are involved (due to mutations). These mutations do not allow the GPIb-IX-V complex to bind to the von Willebrand factor, which in turn is what would help platelets adhere to a site of injury which eventually helps stop bleeding.

== Diagnosis ==
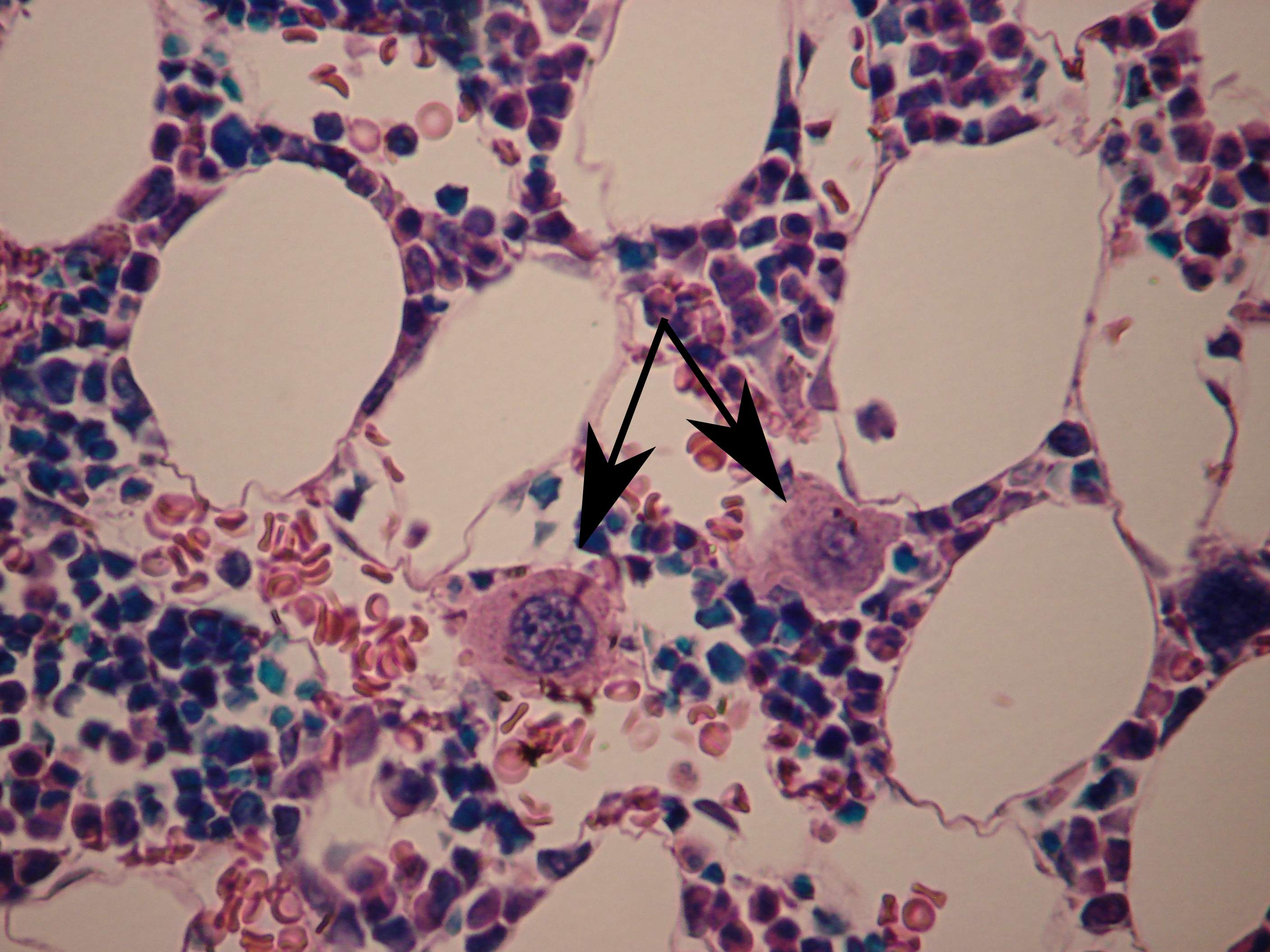
Megakaryocytes (arrows)

In terms of diagnosis Bernard–Soulier syndrome is characterized by prolonged bleeding time, thrombocytopenia, increased megakaryocytes, and enlarged platelets, Bernard–Soulier syndrome is associated with quantitative or qualitative defects of the platelet glycoprotein complex GPIb/V/IX. The degree of thrombocytopenia may be estimated incorrectly, due to the possibility that when the platelet count is performed with automatic counters, giant platelets may reach the size of red blood cells. The large platelets and low platelet count in BSS are seemingly due to the absence of GPIbα and the filamin A binding site that links the GPIb-IX-V complex to the platelet membrane skeleton.

=== Differential diagnosis ===
The differential diagnosis for Bernard–Soulier syndrome includes both Glanzmann thrombasthenia and pediatric Von Willebrand disease. BSS platelets do not aggregate to ristocetin, and this defect is not corrected by the addition of normal plasma, distinguishing it from von Willebrand disease. Following is a table comparing its result with other platelet aggregation disorders:

Platelet aggregation function by main disorders and agonists
	ADP	Epinephrine	Collagen	Ristocetin
P2Y receptor inhibitor or defect	Decreased	Normal	Normal	Normal
Adrenergic receptor defect	Normal	Decreased	Normal	Normal
Collagen receptor defect	Normal	Normal	Decreased or absent	Normal
Von Willebrand disease (except Type 2B); Bernard–Soulier syndrome	Normal	Normal	Normal	Decreased or absent
Glanzmann's thrombasthenia	Decreased	Decreased	Decreased	Normal or decreased

== Treatment ==
Tranexamic acid

Bleeding events can be controlled by platelet transfusion. Most heterozygotes, with few exceptions, do not have a bleeding diathesis. BSS presents as a bleeding disorder due to the inability of platelets to bind and aggregate at sites of vascular endothelial injury. In the event of an individual with mucosal bleeding tranexamic acid can be given.

The affected individual may need to avoid contact sports and medications such as aspirin, which can increase the possibility of bleeding. A potential complication is the possibility of the individual producing anti-platelet antibodies.

== Prevalence ==
The frequency of Bernard–Soulier syndrome is approximately 1 in 1,000,000 people. The syndrome, identified in the year 1948, is named after Dr. Jean Bernard and Dr. Jean Pierre Soulier.

== See also ==
- Gray platelet syndrome
- Glanzmann's thrombasthenia
- von Willebrand disease
- May–Hegglin anomaly
