= Glanzmann's thrombasthenia =

- Other names: Thrombasthenia of Glanzmann and Naegeli
- This condition is inherited in a autosomal recessive manner.
- Specialty: Hematology

Glanzmann's thrombasthenia is an abnormality of the platelets. It is an extremely rare coagulopathy (bleeding disorder due to a blood abnormality), in which the platelets contain defective or low levels of glycoprotein IIb/IIIa (GpIIb/IIIa), which is a receptor for fibrinogen. As a result, no fibrinogen bridging of platelets to other platelets can occur, and the bleeding time is significantly prolonged.

== Signs and symptoms ==
Characteristically, there is increased mucosal bleeding:

- heavy menstrual bleeding
- easy bruising
- nosebleeds
- Bleeding from the gums
- gastrointestinal bleeding
- postpartum bleeding
- increased postoperative bleeding.

The bleeding tendency is variable but may be severe. Bleeding into the joints, particularly spontaneous bleeds, are very rare, in contrast to the hemophilias. Platelet numbers and morphology are normal. Platelet aggregation is normal with ristocetin, but impaired with other agonists such as ADP, thrombin, collagen, or epinephrine.

== Cause ==
Glanzmann's thrombasthenia can be inherited in an autosomal recessive manner or acquired as an autoimmune disorder.

The bleeding tendency in Glanzmann's thrombasthenia is variable, some individuals having minimal bruising, while others have frequent, severe, potentially fatal hemorrhages. Moreover, platelet α_{IIb}β_{3} levels correlate poorly with hemorrhagic severity, as virtually undetectable α_{IIb}β_{3} levels can correlate with negligible bleeding symptoms, and 10–15% levels can correlate with severe bleeding. Unidentified factors other than the platelet defect itself may have important roles.

== Pathophysiology ==
Glanzmann's thrombasthenia is associated with abnormal integrin α_{IIb}β_{3}, formerly known as glycoprotein IIb/IIIa (GpIIb/IIIa), which is an integrin aggregation receptor on platelets. This receptor is activated when the platelet is stimulated by ADP, epinephrine, collagen, or thrombin. GpIIb/IIIa is essential to blood coagulation since the activated receptor has the ability to bind fibrinogen (as well as von Willebrand factor, fibronectin, and vitronectin), which is required for fibrinogen-dependent platelet-platelet interaction (aggregation). Understanding of the role of GpIIb/IIIa in Glanzmann's thrombasthenia led to the development of GpIIb/IIIa inhibitors, a class of powerful antiplatelet agents.

== Diagnosis ==
Light transmission aggregometry is widely accepted as the gold standard diagnostic tool for assessing platelet function, and a result of absent aggregation with any agonist except ristocetin is highly specific for Glanzmann's thrombasthenia. Following is a table comparing its result with other platelet aggregation disorders:

Platelet aggregation function by main disorders and agonists
| | ADP | Epinephrine | Collagen | Ristocetin |
|---|---|---|---|---|
| P2Y receptor inhibitor or defect | Decreased | Normal | Normal | Normal |
| Adrenergic receptor defect | Normal | Decreased | Normal | Normal |
| Collagen receptor defect | Normal | Normal | Decreased or absent | Normal |
| Von Willebrand disease (except Type 2B); Bernard–Soulier syndrome | Normal | Normal | Normal | Decreased or absent |
| Glanzmann's thrombasthenia | Decreased | Decreased | Decreased | Normal or decreased |

== Treatment ==
Therapy involves both preventive measures and treatment of specific bleeding episodes.

- Dental hygiene lessens gingival bleeding
- Avoidance of antiplatelet agents such as aspirin and other anti-inflammatory drugs (NSAIDs) such as ibuprofen and naproxen, and anticoagulants
- Iron or folate supplementation may be necessary if excessive or prolonged bleeding has caused anemia
- Hepatitis B vaccine
- Antifibrinolytic drugs such as tranexamic acid or ε-aminocaproic acid (Amicar)
- Desmopressin (DDAVP) does not normalize the bleeding time in Glanzmann's thrombasthenia but anecdotally improves hemostasis
- Hormonal contraceptives to control excessive menstrual bleeding
- Topical agents such as gelfoam, fibrin sealants, polyethylene glycol polymers, custom dental splints
- Platelet transfusions (only if bleeding is severe; risk of platelet alloimmunization)
- Recombinant factor VIIa, AryoSeven or NovoSeven FDA approved this drug for the treatment of the disease in July 2014.
- Hematopoietic stem cell transplantation (HSCT) for severe recurrent hemorrhages

== Eponym ==
It is named after Eduard Glanzmann (1887–1959), the Swiss pediatrician who originally described it.

== History ==
The subsequent studies, following Eduard Glanzmann's description of hemorrhagic symptoms and "weak platelets", demonstrated that these patients have prolonged bleeding times and their platelets failed to aggregate in response to activation. In the mid-1970s, Nurden and Caen and Phillips and colleagues discovered that thrombasthenic platelets are deficient in integrins α_{IIb}β_{3.}

== See also ==
- Bernard-Soulier syndrome
