= Von Willebrand factor =

Mammalian protein involved in blood clotting

VWF
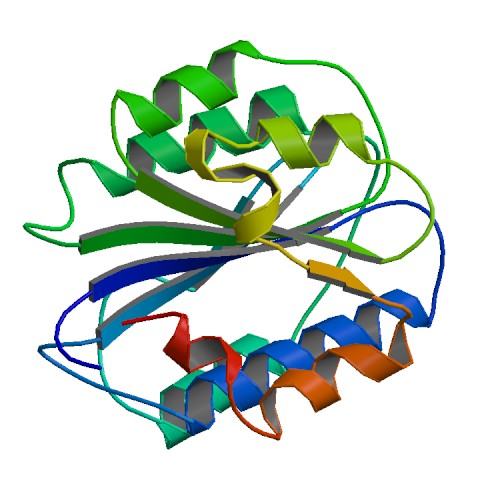

Identifiers
- Aliases: VWF, F8VWD, von Willebrand factor
- External IDs: OMIM: 613160; MGI: 98941; GeneCards: VWF
Available structures
PDB	Ortholog search: PDBe RCSB
PDB	List of PDB id codes 1AO3, 1ATZ, 1AUQ, 1FE8, 1FNS, 1IJB, 1IJK, 1M10, 1OAK, 1U0N, 2ADF, 3GXB, 3HXO, 3HXQ, 3PPV, 3PPW, 3PPX, 3PPY, 3ZQK, 4DMU, 1UEX, 2MHP, 2MHQ, 4C29, 4C2A, 4C2B, 4NT5, 5BV8

Gene location (Human)
Chr.	Chromosome 12 (human)
Band	12p13.31	Start	5,948,877 bp
Band	12p13.31	End	6,124,770 bp

Gene location (Mouse)
Chr.	Chromosome 6 (mouse)
Band	6 F3|6 59.32 cM	Start	125,523,737 bp
Band	6 F3|6 59.32 cM	End	125,663,642 bp
RNA expression pattern
Bgee	Human / Mouse (ortholog); Top expressed in: urethra; tendon of biceps brachii; apex of heart; right lung; upper lobe of left lung; pericardium; left ventricle; subcutaneous adipose tissue; right auricle of heart; lower lobe of lung / Top expressed in: right lung lobe; external carotid artery; internal carotid artery; umbilical cord; tunica media of zone of aorta; blood; carotid body; pineal gland; tunica adventitia of aorta; sciatic nerve; More reference expression data
BioGPS	n/a
Gene ontology
Molecular function	chaperone binding; protein homodimerization activity; collagen binding; protein N-terminus binding; immunoglobulin binding; protease binding; integrin binding; identical protein binding; protein binding; extracellular matrix structural constituent
Cellular component	platelet alpha granule; Weibel-Palade body; extracellular region; endoplasmic reticulum; extracellular exosome; platelet alpha granule lumen; extracellular matrix; collagen-containing extracellular matrix
Biological process	hemostasis; blood coagulation, intrinsic pathway; platelet degranulation; extracellular matrix organization; blood coagulation; cell-substrate adhesion; cell adhesion; response to wounding; protein homooligomerization; platelet activation
Sources:Amigo / QuickGO
Orthologs
Databases	NCBI: entry; OMA: entry
Species	Human	Mouse
Entrez	7450	22371
Ensembl	ENSG00000110799	ENSMUSG00000001930
UniProt	P04275	Q8CIZ8
RefSeq (mRNA)	NM_000552	NM_011708
RefSeq (protein)	NP_000543	NP_035838
Location (UCSC)	Chr 12: 5.95 – 6.12 Mb	Chr 6: 125.52 – 125.66 Mb
PubMed search
- Wikidata
View/Edit Human	View/Edit Mouse

Von Willebrand factor (VWF) (German: [fɔn ˈvɪləbʁant]) is a blood glycoprotein that promotes primary hemostasis, specifically, platelet adhesion. It is deficient and/or defective in von Willebrand disease and is involved in many other diseases, including thrombotic thrombocytopenic purpura, Heyde's syndrome, and possibly hemolytic–uremic syndrome. Increased plasma levels in many cardiovascular, neoplastic, metabolic (e.g. diabetes), and connective tissue diseases are presumed to arise from adverse changes to the endothelium, and may predict an increased risk of thrombosis.

Platelet adhesion is mainly mediated via interactions with VWF, which acts as a bridge between the platelet surface receptor glycoprotein Ib (GpIb) and the exposed collagen after vascular injury. Genetic deficiencies of VWF or GpIb (Bernard–Soulier syndrome) result in bleeding disorders.

== Biochemistry ==
=== Synthesis ===
VWF is a large multimeric glycoprotein present in blood plasma and produced constitutively as ultra-large VWF in endothelium (in the Weibel–Palade bodies) and megakaryocytes (α-granules of platelets).

=== Structure ===
VWF is synthesized as a prepropeptide comprising 2813 amino acids in endothelial cells and megakaryocytes. The prepropeptide includes a 22-amino acid signal peptide (SP), a 741-amino-acid propeptide (VWFpp), and a 2050-amino-acid mature VWF monomer. The signal peptide directs the prepropeptide to the endoplasmic reticulum, where it is cleaved, resulting in the formation of pro-VWF. Pro-VWF undergoes glycosylation, forms disulfide bonds, and dimerizes under neutral pH and the influence of protein disulfide isomerase A1 (PDIA1).

Dimerized pro-VWF is then transported to the Golgi apparatus, where it forms "dimeric bouquets" and undergoes further glycosylation. The propeptide is cleaved by furin, but remains associated with the mature VWF in a non-covalent manner. This association persists until the propeptide dissociates, yielding mature VWF monomers, which subsequently dimerize and multimerize. Although the fundamental structure of mature VWF is monomeric, the smallest form detectable in blood plasma is a VWF dimer.

The basic monomer of VWF, a 2050-amino-acid protein, contains several key domains with specific functions:

- The D'/D3 domain: Binds to factor VIII, heparin, and P-selectin.
- The A1 domain: Binds to the platelet GPIb-receptor, collagen types IV and VI, heparin, and osteoprotegerin.
- The A2 domain: Unfolds to expose the cleavage site for ADAMTS13 protease, which cleaves VWF into smaller multimers. Unfolding is influenced by blood shear flow, calcium binding, and a "vicinal disulfide" at the A2-domain's C-terminus.
- The A3 domain: Acts as the primary collagen binding site for VWF, binding to collagen types I and III.
- The C4 domain: Contains an RGD motif that binds to platelet integrin αIIbβ3.
- The CK (cystine knot) domain at the protein's C-terminal end: Involved in VWF dimerization.

VWF is one of the few proteins carrying ABO blood group antigens. After glycosylation in the Golgi apparatus, VWF is packaged into storage granules, Weibel–Palade bodies (WPBs) in endothelial cells, and α-granules in platelets.

VWF monomer and multimers.

=== Function ===
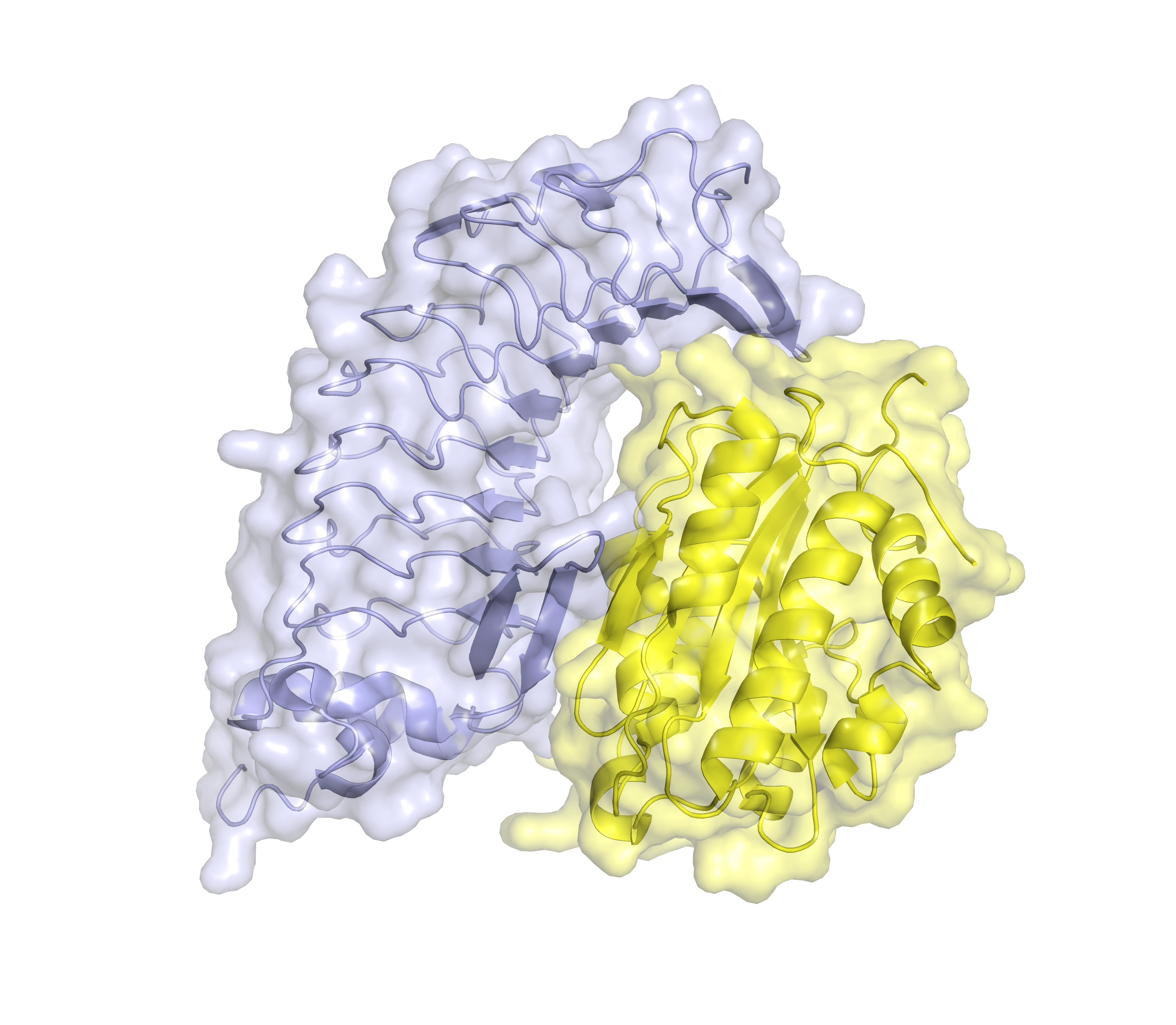
The interaction of VWF and GP1b alpha. The GP1b receptor on the surface of platelets allows the platelet to bind to VWF, which is exposed upon damage to vasculature. The VWF A1 domain (yellow) interacts with the extracellular domain of GP1ba (blue).

Von Willebrand Factor's primary function is binding to other proteins, in particular factor VIII, and it is important in platelet adhesion to wound sites. It is not an enzyme and, thus, has no catalytic activity.

VWF binds to a number of cells and molecules. The most important ones are:

- Factor VIII is bound to VWF while inactive in circulation; factor VIII degrades rapidly when not bound to VWF. Factor VIII is released from VWF by the action of thrombin. In the absence of VWF, factor VIII has a half-life of 1–2 hours; when carried by intact VWF, factor VIII has a half-life of 8–12 hours.
- VWF binds to collagen, e.g., when collagen is exposed beneath endothelial cells due to damage occurring to the blood vessel. Endothelium also releases VWF which forms additional links between the platelets' glycoprotein Ib/IX/V and the collagen fibrils
- VWF binds to platelet GpIb when it forms a complex with gpIX and gpV; this binding occurs under all circumstances, but is most efficient under high shear stress (i.e., rapid blood flow in narrow blood vessels, see below).
- VWF binds to other platelet receptors when they are activated, e.g., by thrombin (i.e., when coagulation has been stimulated).

VWF plays a major role in blood coagulation. Therefore, VWF deficiency or dysfunction (von Willebrand disease) leads to a bleeding tendency, which is most apparent in tissues having high blood flow shear in narrow vessels. From studies it appears that VWF uncoils under these circumstances, decelerating passing platelets. Recent research also suggests that von Willebrand Factor is involved in the formation of blood vessels themselves, which would explain why some people with von Willebrand disease develop vascular malformations (predominantly in the digestive tract) that can bleed excessively.

=== Catabolism ===
The biological breakdown (catabolism) of VWF is largely mediated by the enzyme ADAMTS13 (acronym of "a disintegrin-like and metalloprotease with thrombospondin type 1 motif no. 13"). It is a metalloproteinase that cleaves VWF between tyrosine at position 842 and methionine at position 843 (or 1605–1606 of the gene) in the A2 domain. This breaks down the multimers into smaller units, which are degraded by other peptidases.

The half-life of vWF in human plasma is around 16 hours; glycosylation variation on vWF molecules from different individuals result in a larger range of 4.2 to 26 hours. Liver cells as well as macrophages take up vWF for clearance via ASGPRs, Macrophage Galactose Lectin, and LRP1. SIGLEC5 and CLEC4M also recognize vWF.

== Role in disease ==
Hereditary or acquired defects of VWF lead to von Willebrand disease (vWD), a bleeding diathesis of the skin and mucous membranes, causing nosebleeds, menorrhagia, and gastrointestinal bleeding. The point at which the mutation occurs determines the severity of the bleeding diathesis. There are three types (I, II and III), and type II is further divided in several subtypes. Treatment depends on the nature of the abnormality and the severity of the symptoms. Most cases of vWD are hereditary, but abnormalities of VWF may be acquired; aortic valve stenosis, for instance, has been linked to vWD type IIA, causing gastrointestinal bleeding - an association known as Heyde's syndrome.

In thrombotic thrombocytopenic purpura (TTP) and hemolytic–uremic syndrome (HUS), ADAMTS13 either is deficient or has been inhibited by antibodies directed at the enzyme. This leads to decreased breakdown of the ultra-large multimers of VWF and microangiopathic hemolytic anemia with deposition of fibrin and platelets in small vessels, and capillary necrosis. In TTP, the organ most obviously affected is the brain; in HUS, the kidney.

Higher levels of VWF are more common among people that have had ischemic stroke (from blood-clotting) for the first time. Occurrence is not affected by ADAMTS13, and the only significant genetic factor is the person's blood group. High plasma VWF levels were found to be an independent predictor of major bleeding in anticoagulated atrial fibrillation patients. VWF is a marker of endothelial dysfunction, and is consistently elevated in atrial fibrillation, associated with adverse outcomes.

== History ==
VWF is named after Erik Adolf von Willebrand, a Finnish physician who in 1926 first described a hereditary bleeding disorder in families from Åland. Although von Willebrand did not identify the definite cause, he distinguished von Willebrand disease (vWD) from hemophilia and other forms of bleeding diathesis.

In the 1950s, vWD was shown to be caused by a plasma factor deficiency (instead of being caused by platelet disorders), and, in the 1970s, the VWF protein was purified. Harvey J. Weiss and coworkers developed a quantitative assay for VWF function that remains a mainstay of laboratory evaluation for VWD to this day.

== Interactions ==
Von Willebrand Factor has been shown to interact with Collagen, type I, alpha 1.

Recently, It has been reported that the cooperation and interactions within the von Willebrand Factors enhances the adsorption probability in the primary haemostasis. Such cooperation is proven by calculating the adsorption probability of flowing VWF once it crosses another adsorbed one. Such cooperation is held within a wide range of shear rates.

== See also ==
- von Willebrand disease
- Bernard–Soulier syndrome
