= Prothrombinase =

Complex that catalyzes conversion of prothrombin to thrombin

The prothrombinase enzyme complex consists of factor Xa (a serine protease) and factor Va (a protein cofactor). The complex assembles on negatively charged phospholipid membranes in the presence of calcium ions. The prothrombinase complex catalyzes the conversion of prothrombin (factor II), an inactive zymogen, to thrombin (factor IIa), an active serine protease. The activation of thrombin is a critical reaction in the coagulation cascade, which functions to regulate hemostasis in the body. To produce thrombin, the prothrombinase complex cleaves two peptide bonds in prothrombin, one after Arg^{271} and the other after Arg^{320}. Although it has been shown that factor Xa can activate prothrombin when unassociated with the prothrombinase complex, the rate of thrombin formation is severely decreased under such circumstances. The prothrombinase complex can catalyze the activation of prothrombin at a rate 300,000-fold faster than can factor Xa alone. Thus, the prothrombinase complex is required for the efficient production of activated thrombin and also for adequate hemostasis.

== Activation of protein precursors ==
Both factor X and factor V circulate in the blood as inactive precursors prior to activation by the coagulation cascade. The inactive zymogen factor X consists of two chains, a light chain (136 residues) and a heavy chain (306 residues). The light chain contains an N-terminal γ-carboxyglutamic acid domain (Gla domain) and two epidermal growth factor-like domains (EGF1 and EGF2). The heavy chain consists of an N-terminal activation peptide and a serine-protease domain. Factor X can be activated by both the factor VIIa-tissue factor complex of the extrinsic coagulation pathway and by the tenase complex of the intrinsic pathway. The intrinsic tenase complex is composed of both factor IXa and factor VIIIa. The activation peptide is released when factor X is activated to factor Xa, but the heavy and light chains remain covalently linked following activation.

Factor V circulates as a single-chain procofactor which contains six domains, A1-A2-B-A3-C1-C2. Thrombin activates factor V by cleaving off the B domain. Other proteases also activate factor V, but this cleavage is primarily carried out by thrombin. Following cleavage, factor Va contains a heavy chain, composed of the A1 and A2 domains and a light chain, consisting of the A3, C1, and C2 domains. The light and heavy chains of factor Va are linked via a divalent metal ion, such as calcium.

== Complex assembly ==
Prothrombinase assembly begins with the binding of factor Xa and factor Va to negatively charged phospholipids on plasma membranes. Activated factor Xa and factor Va bind to the plasma membranes of a variety of different cell types, including monocytes, platelets, and endothelial cells. Both factor Xa and Va bind to the membrane independently of each other, but they both bind to mutually exclusive binding sites. Both factor Xa and factor Va associate with the membrane via their light chains, with factor Xa binding via its Gla-domain in a calcium-dependent manner and factor Va via its C2 and C1 domains. Once bound to the plasma membrane, Factor Xa and factor Va rapidly associate in a 1:1 stoichiometric ratio to form the prothrombinase complex. Assembly of the prothrombinase complex is calcium dependent. When associated with the prothrombinase complex, the catalytic efficiency of factor Xa is increased 300,000-fold compared to its efficiency alone. Factor Xa and factor Va interact tightly with each other when associated on the plasma membrane. Further, membrane-bound factor Va provides a strong catalytic advantage to the prothrombinase complex. Factor Va strengthens the affinity of factor Xa for the membrane and also increases the kcat of factor Xa for prothrombin. Factor Va also decreases the Km of the reaction by enhancing the binding of prothrombin to the prothrombinase complex.

== Activity ==
The fully assembled prothrombinase complex catalyzes the conversion of the zymogen prothrombin to the serine protease thrombin. Specifically, Factor Xa cleaves prothrombin in two locations, following Arg^{271} and Arg^{320} in human prothrombin. Because there are two cleavage events, prothrombin activation can proceed by two pathways. In one pathway, prothrombin is first cleaved at Arg^{271}. This cleavage produces Fragment 1•2, comprising the first 271 residues, and the intermediate prethrombin 2, which is made up of residues 272-579. Fragment 1•2 is released as an activation peptide, and prethrombin 2 is cleaved at Arg^{320}, yielding active thrombin. The two chains formed after the cleavage at Arg^{320}, termed the A and B chains, are linked by a disulfide bond in active thrombin. In the alternate pathway for thrombin activation, prothrombin is first cleaved at Arg^{320}, producing a catalytically active intermediate called meizothrombin. Meizothrombin contains fragment 1•2 A chain linked to the B chain by a disulfide bond. Subsequent cleavage of meizothrombin by factor Xa at Arg^{271} gives fragment 1•2 and active thrombin, consisting of the A and B chains linked by a disulfide bond. When thrombin is generated by factor Xa alone, the first pathway predominates and prothrombin is first cleaved after Arg^{271}, producing prethrombin 2, which is subsequently cleaved after Arg^{320}. If factor Xa acts as a component of the prothrombinase complex, however, the second pathway is favored, and prothrombin is first cleaved after Arg^{320}, producing meizothrombin, which is cleaved after Arg^{271} to produce active thrombin. Thus, the formation of the prothrombinase complex alters the sequence of prothrombin bond cleavage.

== Inactivation ==
Factor Va is inactivated following cleavage by activated protein C. Activated protein C cleaves factor Va in both its light and heavy chains. Cleavage in the heavy chain reduces the ability of factor V to bind to factor Xa. Activated protein C interacts tightly and exclusively with the light chain of factor Va, and this interaction is calcium independent. Factor Xa can help to prevent the inactivation of factor Va by protecting factor Va from activated protein C. It is likely that factor Xa and activated protein C compete for similar sites on factor Va. Factor Xa is inhibited by the antithrombin III/heparin system, which also acts to inhibit thrombin.

== Role in disease ==
Deficiencies of either protein components of the prothrombinase complex are very rare. Factor V deficiency, also called parahemophilia, is a rare autosomal recessive bleeding disorder with an approximate incidence of 1 in 1,000,000. Congenital factor X deficiency is also extremely rare, affecting an estimated 1 in 1,000,000.

A point mutation in the gene encoding factor V can lead to a hypercoagulability disorder called factor V Leiden. In factor V Leiden, a G1691A nucleotide replacement results in an R506Q amino acid mutation. Factor V Leiden increases the risk of venous thrombosis by two known mechanisms. First, activated protein C normally inactivates factor Va by cleaving the cofactor at Arg^{306}, Arg^{506}, and Arg^{679}. The factor V Leiden mutation at Arg^{506} renders factor Va resistant to inactivation by activated protein C. As a result of this resistance, the half-life of factor Va in plasma is increased, resulting in increased thrombin production and increased risk of thrombosis. Secondly, under normal conditions, if factor V is cleaved by activated protein C instead of thrombin, it can serve as a cofactor for activated protein C. Once bound to factor V, activated protein C cleaves and inactivates factor VIIIa. The mutated form of factor V present in factor V Leiden, however, serves as a less efficient cofactor of activated protein C. Thus, Factor VIIIa is less efficiently inactivated in factor V Leiden, further increasing the risk of thrombosis. In fact, Factor V Leiden is the most common cause of inherited thrombosis.

Heterozygous factor V Leiden is present in approximately 5% of the white population in the United States and homozygous factor V Leiden is found less than 1% of this population. Factor V Leiden is much more common in individuals of Northern European descent and in some Middle Eastern populations. It is less common in Hispanic populations, and rare in African, Asian, and Native American populations. Factor V Leiden is an important risk factor for venous thromboembolism, that is, deep vein thrombosis or pulmonary embolism. In fact, heterozygous factor V Leiden increases one's risk of recurrent venous thromboembolism by 40%.

== Anticoagulant drugs ==
Inhibition of factor Xa prevents thrombin activation, thereby preventing clot formation. Thus, Factor Xa is used as both a direct and indirect target of several anticoagulant drugs. For example, the drug Fondaparinux is an indirect inhibitor of factor Xa. Fondaparinux binds to antithrombin III and activates the molecule for factor Xa inhibition. In fact, Fondaparinux imparts an increased affinity of antithrombin III to factor Xa, and this increased affinity results in a 300-fold increase in the antithrombin III inhibitory effect on factor Xa. After the antithrombin III binds to factor Xa, the Fondaparinux is released and can activate another antithrombin. Another drug that indirectly inhibits factor Xa is Idraparinux. Idraparinux also binds antithrombin III, however with a 30-fold increase in affinity as compared to Fondaparinux. Idraparinux has an increased half-life as compared to Fondaparinux and can be administered on a weekly basis, whereas Fondaparinux must be subcutaneously injected daily.

Rivaroxaban, Apixaban and Edoxaban are direct factor Xa inhibitors.

Rivaroxaban, Apixaban and Edoxaban bind to the active site of factor Xa, regardless of whether factor Xa is bound in the prothrombinase complex or is in its free form. These direct factor Xa inhibitors can be administered orally, as can dabigatran etexilate, which is a direct thrombin inhibitor.

Fondaparinux, Rivaroxaban, Apixaban, Dabigatran Etexilate and Edoxaban are currently used as FDA-approved anticoagulant drugs. Development of Idraparinux was discontinued.

== See also ==
- Coagulation cascade
- Hemostasis
