= Russellysin =

Identifiers
- EC no.: 3.4.24.58
- CAS no.: 79393-92-3

Databases
- IntEnz: IntEnz view
- BRENDA: BRENDA entry
- ExPASy: NiceZyme view
- KEGG: KEGG entry
- MetaCyc: metabolic pathway
- PRIAM: profile
- PDB structures: RCSB PDB PDBe PDBsum
Search
- PMC: articles
- PubMed: articles
- NCBI: proteins

Russellysin (EC 3.4.24.58, Russell's viper venom factor X activator, RVV-X, blood-coagulation factor X activating enzyme, metalloproteinase RVV-x, Vipera russelli proteinase, Russell's viper blood coagulation factor X activator, RVV-V) is an enzyme. This enzyme catalyses the following chemical reaction

Specifically activates several components of the blood clotting system, including coagulation factor X, coagulation factor IX and protein C by cleavage of -Arg- bonds. Has no action on insulin B chain

This enzyme is present in the venom of Russell's viper (Vipera russelli).
