= Prothrombin time =

Blood test that evaluates clotting

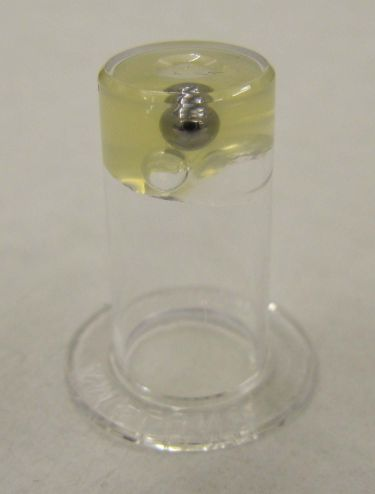
- Blood plasma after the addition of tissue factor. The gel-like structure is strong enough to hold a steel ball.
- MeSH: D011517

The prothrombin time (PT) – along with its derived measures of prothrombin ratio (PR) and international normalized ratio (INR) – is an assay for evaluating the extrinsic pathway and common pathway of coagulation. This blood test is also called protime INR and PT/INR. They are used to determine the clotting tendency of blood, in conditions such as the measure of warfarin dosage, liver damage (cirrhosis), and vitamin K status. PT measures the following coagulation factors: I (fibrinogen), II (prothrombin), V (proaccelerin), VII (proconvertin), and X (Stuart–Prower factor).

PT is often used in conjunction with the activated partial thromboplastin time (aPTT) which measures the intrinsic pathway and common pathway of coagulation.

== Laboratory measurement ==
The reference range for prothrombin time depends on the analytical method used, but is usually around 12–13 seconds (results should always be interpreted using the reference range from the laboratory that performed the test), and the INR in absence of anticoagulation therapy is 0.8–1.2. The target range for INR in anticoagulant use (e.g. warfarin) is 2 to 3. In some cases, if more intense anticoagulation is thought to be required, the target range may be as high as 2.5–3.5 depending on the indication for anticoagulation.

=== Methodology ===
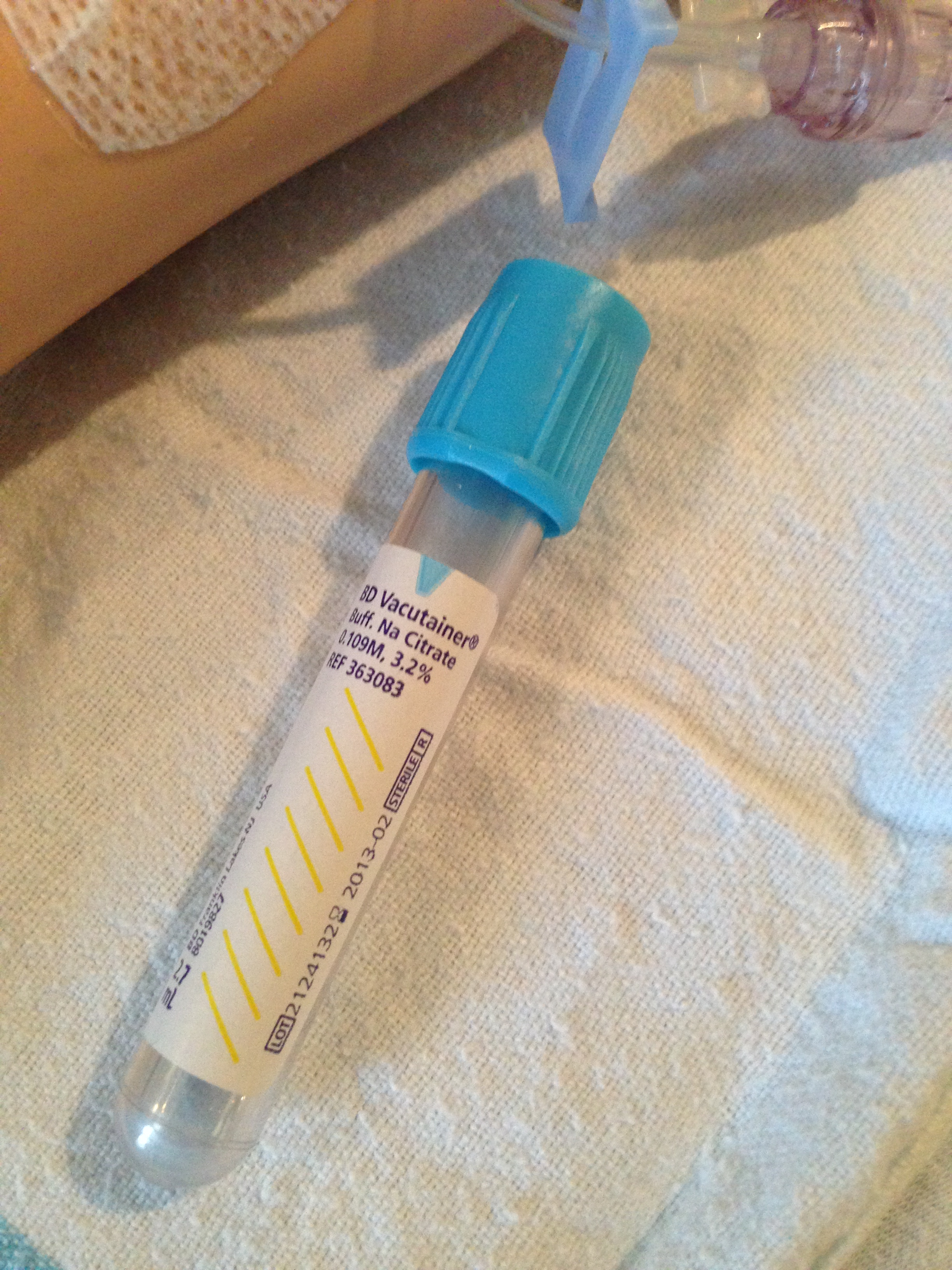
Vacutainer tube used for PT and PTT blood tests

Prothrombin time is typically analyzed by a laboratory technologist on an automated instrument at 37 °C (as a nominal approximation of normal human body temperature).

- Blood is drawn into a test tube containing liquid sodium citrate, which acts as an anticoagulant by binding the calcium in a sample. The blood is mixed, then centrifuged to separate blood cells from plasma (as prothrombin time is most commonly measured using blood plasma). In newborns, a capillary whole blood specimen is used.
- A sample of the plasma is extracted from the test tube and placed into a measuring test tube (Note: for an accurate measurement, the ratio of blood to citrate needs to be fixed and should be labeled on the side of the measuring test tube by the manufacturing company; many laboratories will not perform the assay if the tube is underfilled and contains a relatively high concentration of citrate—the standardized dilution of 1 part anticoagulant to 9 parts whole blood is no longer valid).
- Next an excess of calcium (in a phospholipid suspension) is added to the test tube, thereby reversing the effects of citrate and enabling the blood to clot again.
- Finally, in order to activate the extrinsic / tissue factor clotting cascade pathway, tissue factor (also known as factor III) is added and the time the sample takes to clot is measured optically. Some laboratories use a mechanical measurement, which eliminates interferences from lipemic and icteric samples.

=== Prothrombin time ratio ===
The prothrombin time ratio is the ratio of a subject's measured prothrombin time (in seconds) to the normal laboratory reference PT. The PT ratio varies depending on the specific reagents used, and has been replaced by the INR.

=== International normalized ratio ===
The result (in seconds) for a prothrombin time performed on a normal individual will vary according to the type of analytical system employed. This is due to the variations between different types and batches of manufacturer's tissue factor used in the reagent to perform the test. The INR was devised to standardize the results. Each manufacturer assigns an ISI value (International Sensitivity Index) for any tissue factor they manufacture. The ISI value indicates how a particular batch of tissue factor compares to an international reference tissue factor. The ISI is usually between 0.94 and 1.4 for more sensitive and 2.0–3.0 for less sensitive thromboplastins.

The INR is the ratio of a patient's prothrombin time to a normal (control) sample, raised to the power of the ISI value for the analytical system being used.

$$\text{INR}= \left(\frac{\text{PT}_\text{test}}{\text{PT}_\text{normal}}\right)^\text{ISI}$$

PT_{normal} is established as the geometric mean of the prothrombin times (PT) of a reference sample group.

=== Interpretation ===
The prothrombin time is the time it takes plasma to clot after addition of tissue factor (obtained from animals such as rabbits, or recombinant tissue factor, or from brains of autopsy patients). This measures the quality of the extrinsic pathway (as well as the common pathway) of coagulation. The speed of the extrinsic pathway is greatly affected by levels of functional factor VII in the body. Factor VII has a short half-life and the carboxylation of its glutamate residues requires vitamin K. The prothrombin time can be prolonged as a result of deficiencies in vitamin K, warfarin therapy, malabsorption, or lack of intestinal colonization by bacteria (such as in newborns). In addition, poor factor VII synthesis (due to liver disease) or increased consumption (in disseminated intravascular coagulation) may prolong the PT.

The INR is typically used to monitor patients being treated with anticoagulants of the vitamin K antagonist type, such as warfarin. However, prothrombin time and INR are insufficient for monitoring therapy with direct oral anticoagulants (DOACs). The normal range for a healthy person not using warfarin is 0.8–1.2, and for people on warfarin therapy an INR of 2.0–3.0 is usually targeted, although the target INR may be higher in particular situations, such as for those with a mechanical heart valve. If the INR is outside the target range, a high INR indicates a higher risk of bleeding, while a low INR suggests a higher risk of developing a clot. In patients on a vitamin K antagonist such as warfarin with supratherapeutic INR but INR less than 10 and no bleeding, it is enough to lower the dose or omit a dose, monitor the INR and resume the vitamin K antagonist at an adjusted lower dose when the target INR is reached. For people who need rapid reversal of the vitamin K antagonist – such as due to serious bleeding – or who need emergency surgery, the effects of warfarin can be reversed with vitamin K, prothrombin complex concentrate (PCC), or fresh frozen plasma (FFP).

=== Factors determining accuracy ===
Lupus anticoagulant, a circulating inhibitor predisposing for thrombosis, may skew PT results, depending on the assay used. Variations between various thromboplastin preparations have in the past led to decreased accuracy of INR readings, and a 2005 study suggested that despite international calibration efforts (by INR) there were still statistically significant differences between various kits, casting doubt on the long-term tenability of PT/INR as a measure for anticoagulant therapy. Indeed, a new prothrombin time variant, the Fiix prothrombin time, intended solely for monitoring warfarin and other vitamin K antagonists has been invented and recently become available as a manufactured test. The Fiix prothrombin time is only affected by reductions in factor II and/or factor X and this stabilizes the anticoagulant effect and appears to improve clinical outcome according to an investigator initiated randomized blinded clinical trial, The Fiix-trial. In this trial thromboembolism was reduced by 50% during long-term treatment and despite that bleeding was not increased.

== Statistics ==
An estimated 800 million PT/INR assays are performed annually worldwide.

== Near-patient testing ==
In addition to the laboratory method outlined above, near-patient testing (NPT) or home INR monitoring is becoming increasingly common in some countries. In the United Kingdom, for example, near-patient testing is used both by patients at home and by some anticoagulation clinics (often hospital-based) as a fast and convenient alternative to the lab method. After a period of doubt about the accuracy of NPT results, a new generation of machines and reagents seems to be gaining acceptance for its ability to deliver results close in accuracy to those of the lab.

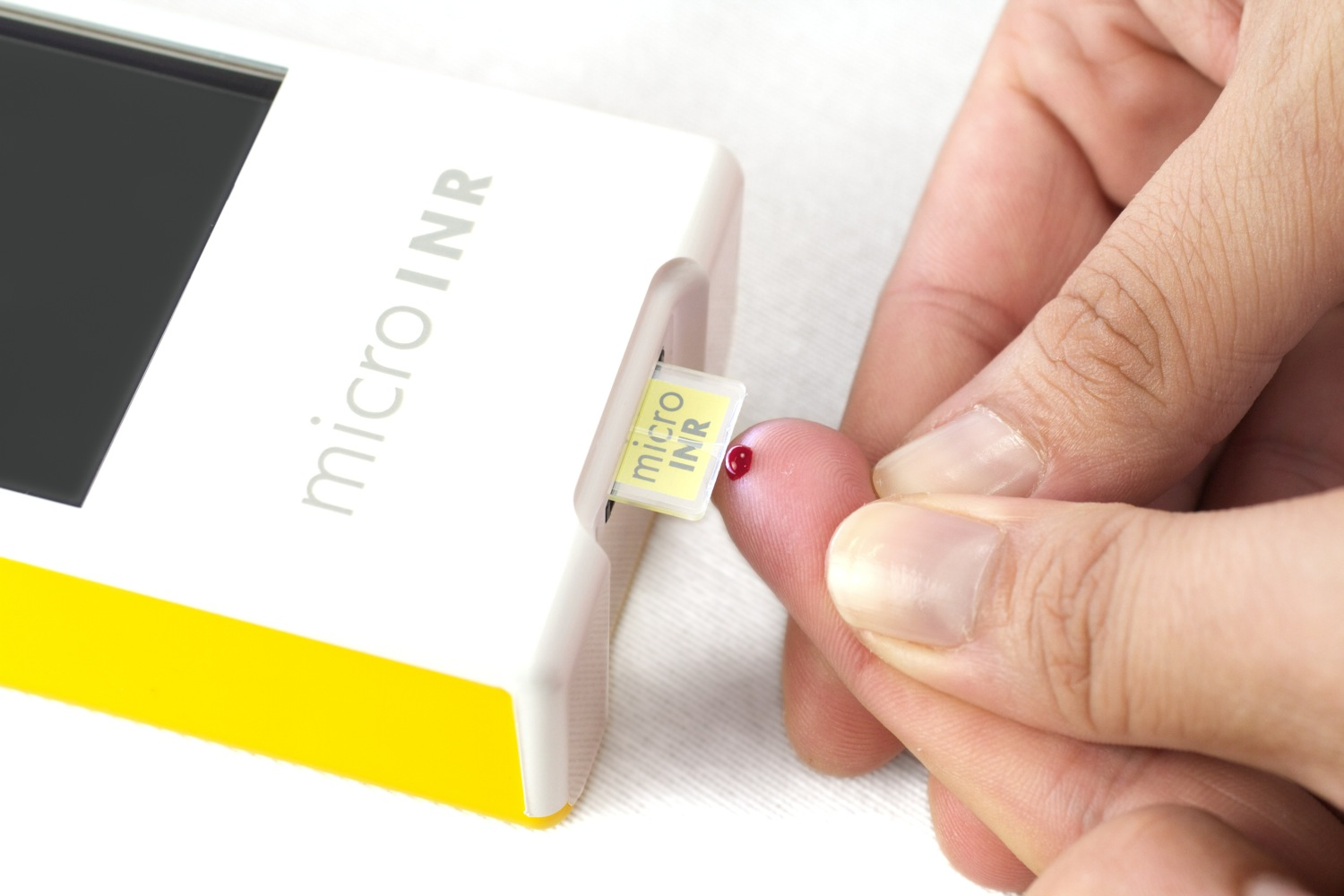
Patient testing with microINR from iLine Microsystems

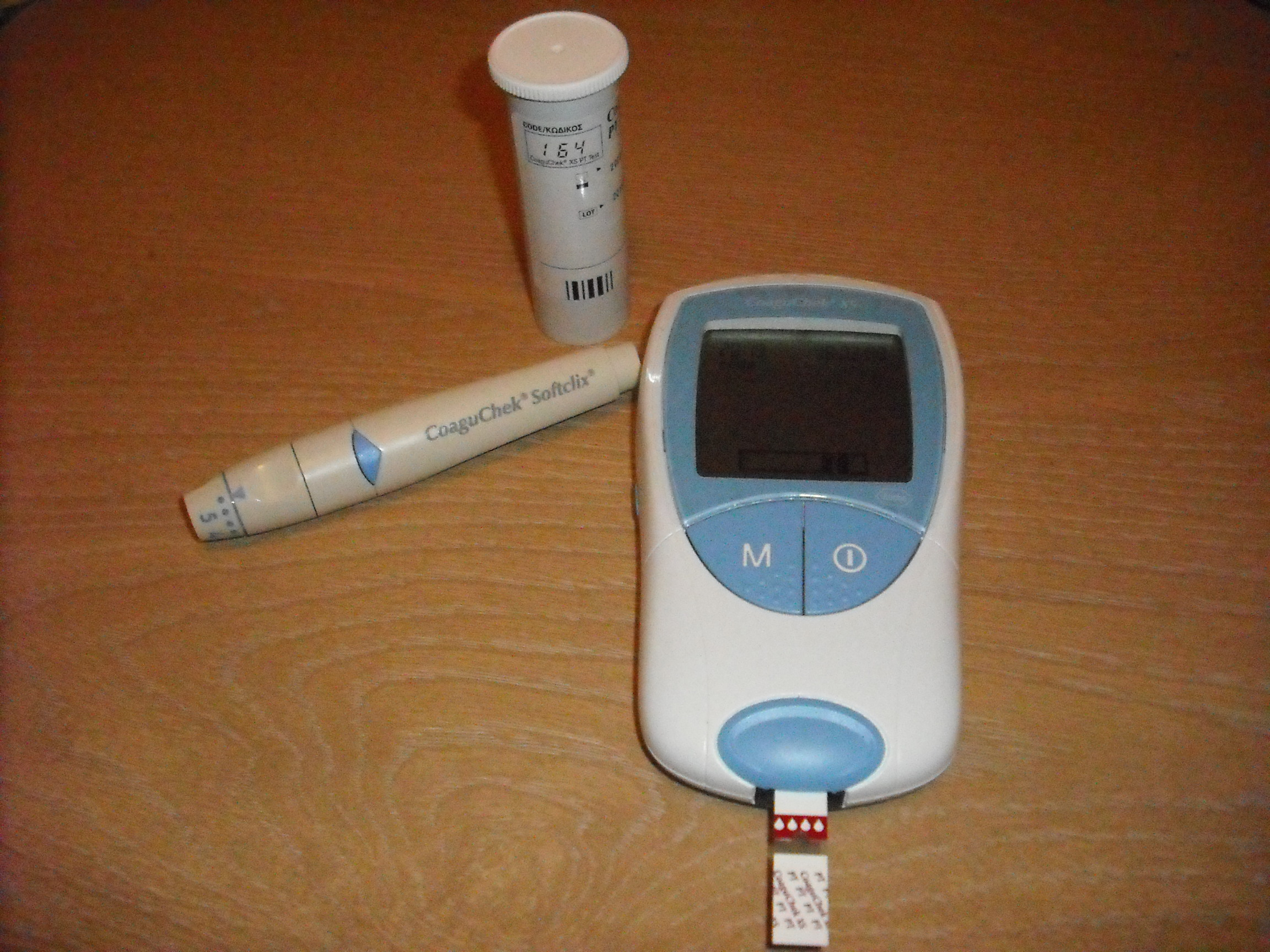
A Roche CoaguChek XS

In a typical NPT set up, a small table-top device is used. A drop of capillary blood is obtained with an automated finger-prick, which is almost painless. This drop is placed on a disposable test strip with which the machine has been prepared. The resulting INR comes up on the display a few seconds later. A similar form of testing is used by people with diabetes for monitoring blood sugar levels, which is easily taught and routinely practiced.

Local policy determines whether the patient or a coagulation specialist (pharmacist, nurse, general practitioner or hospital doctor) interprets the result and determines the dose of medication. In Germany and Austria, patients may adjust the medication dose themselves, while in the UK and the US this remains in the hands of a health care professional.

A significant advantage of home testing is the evidence that patient self-testing with medical support and patient self-management (where patients adjust their own anticoagulant dose) improves anticoagulant control. A meta analysis which reviewed 14 trials showed that home testing led to a reduced incidence of complications (bleeding and thrombosis) and improved the time in the therapeutic range, which is an indirect measure of anticoagulant control. In 2022, a smartphone system was introduced by researchers to perform PT/INR testing in an inexpensive and accessible manner. It uses the vibration motor and camera ubiquitous on smartphones to track micro-mechanical movements of a copper particle and compute PT/INR values.

Other advantages of the NPT approach are that it is fast and convenient, usually less painful, and offers, in home use, the ability for patients to measure their own INRs when required. Among its problems are that quite a steady hand is needed to deliver the blood to the exact spot, that some patients find the finger-pricking difficult, and that the cost of the test strips must also be taken into account. In the UK these are available on prescription so that elderly and unwaged people will not pay for them and others will pay only a standard prescription charge, which at the moment represents only about 20% of the retail price of the strips. In the US, NPT in the home is currently reimbursed by Medicare for patients with mechanical heart valves, while private insurers may cover for other indications. Medicare is now covering home testing for patients with chronic atrial fibrillation. Home testing requires a doctor's prescription and that the meter and supplies are obtained from a Medicare-approved Independent Diagnostic Testing Facility (IDTF).

There is some evidence to suggest that NPT may be less accurate for certain patients, for example those who have the lupus anticoagulant.

=== Guidelines ===
International guidelines were published in 2005 to govern home monitoring of oral anticoagulation by the International Self-Monitoring Association for Oral Anticoagulation. The international guidelines study stated, "The consensus agrees that patient self-testing and patient self-management are effective methods of monitoring oral anticoagulation therapy, providing outcomes at least as good as, and possibly better than, those achieved with an anticoagulation clinic. All patients must be appropriately selected and trained. Currently, available self-testing/self-management devices give INR results which are comparable with those obtained in laboratory testing."

Medicare coverage for home testing of INR has been expanded in order to allow more people access to home testing of INR in the US. The release on 19 March 2008 said, "[t]he Centers for Medicare & Medicaid Services (CMS) expanded Medicare coverage for home blood testing of prothrombin time (PT) International Normalized Ratio (INR) to include beneficiaries who are using the drug warfarin, an anticoagulant (blood thinner) medication, for chronic atrial fibrillation or venous thromboembolism." In addition, "those Medicare beneficiaries and their physicians managing conditions related to chronic atrial fibrillation or venous thromboembolism will benefit greatly through the use of the home test."

== History ==
The prothrombin time was developed by Armand J. Quick and colleagues in 1935, and a second method was published by Paul Owren, also called the "p and p" or "prothrombin and proconvertin" method. It aided in the identification of the anticoagulants dicumarol and warfarin, and was used subsequently as a measure of activity for warfarin when used therapeutically.

The INR was invented in the early 1980s by Tom Kirkwood working at the UK National Institute for Biological Standards and Control (and subsequently at the UK National Institute for Medical Research) to provide a consistent way of expressing the prothrombin time ratio, which had previously suffered from a large degree of variation between centres using different reagents. The INR was coupled to Dr Kirkwood's simultaneous invention of the International Sensitivity Index (ISI), which provided the means to calibrate different batches of thromboplastins to an international standard. The INR became widely accepted worldwide, especially after endorsement by the World Health Organization.

== See also ==
- D-dimer
- Partial thromboplastin time (PTT), or activated partial thromboplastin time (aPTT or APTT)
- Thrombin time (TT)
- Thrombodynamics test
- Thromboelastography
- Thrombus
