= Cancer procoagulant =

Hypothesised protein

Identifiers
- EC no.: 3.4.22.26
- CAS no.: 109456-80-6

Databases
- IntEnz: IntEnz view
- BRENDA: BRENDA entry
- ExPASy: NiceZyme view
- KEGG: KEGG entry
- MetaCyc: metabolic pathway
- PRIAM: profile
- PDB structures: RCSB PDB PDBe PDBsum
Search
- PMC: articles
- PubMed: articles
- NCBI: proteins

Cancer procoagulant is a hypothesised protein, most likely a cysteine protease enzyme (EC 3.4.22.26), that occurs only in fetal and malignant cells. Its activity appears to be the activation of factor X, one of the coagulation factors, and would account for the increased incidence of thrombosis in cancer patients. Tissue factor (TF) is also known to be present at increased levels around malignant cells.
