= Thromboplastin =

Composite blood component made of protein and phospholipids

Thromboplastin (TPL) is derived from cell membranes and is a mixture of both phospholipids and tissue factor, neither of which are enzymes. Thromboplastin acts on and accelerates the activity of Factor Xa, also known as thrombokinase, aiding blood coagulation through catalyzing the conversion of prothrombin to thrombin. Thromboplastin is found in brain, lung, and other tissues and especially in blood platelets.

Thromboplastin is sometimes used as a synonym for the protein tissue factor (with its official name "Coagulation factor III [thromboplastin, tissue factor]"). Historically, thromboplastin was a lab reagent, usually derived from placental sources, used to assay prothrombin times (PT).

When manipulated in the laboratory, a derivative could be created called partial thromboplastin. Partial thromboplastin was used to measure the intrinsic pathway. This test is called the aPTT, or activated partial thromboplastin time. It was not until much later that the subcomponents of thromboplastin and partial thromboplastin were identified. Thromboplastin is the combination of both phospholipids and tissue factor, both of which are needed in the activation of the extrinsic pathway. However, partial thromboplastin is just phospholipids, and not tissue factor. Therefore, although the coagulation cascade can be triggered in vitro through the intrinsic pathway only, in vivo coagulation is triggered by the extrinsic pathway. However, the model better describing how coagulation works is the so-called cell-based model, a more integrated picture of the whole process, in which phospholipid surfaces, such as those provided by platelets, are a key component.

Currently, recombinant tissue factor is available and used in some PT assays. Placental derivatives are still available and are used in some laboratories. Phospholipid is available as an independent reagent or in combination with tissue factor as thromboplastin. Complete thromboplastin consists of tissue factor, phospholipids (since platelets were removed from blood sample being tested), and CaCl_{2} to reintroduce calcium ions which were chelated by sodium citrate originally used to prevent coagulation of the sample blood during transportation and/or storage.

== See also ==
- Tissue factor
