= Tenase =

Complex formed by blood clotting factors X and V

In coagulation, the coagulation factor X can be activated into factor Xa in two ways: either extrinsically or intrinsically.

The activating complexes are together called tenase. Tenase is a blend word of "ten" and the suffix "-ase", which means, that the complex activates its substrate (inactive factor X) by cleaving it.

Extrinsic tenase complex is made up of tissue factor, factor VII, and Ca^{2+} as an activating ion.

Intrinsic tenase complex contains the active factor IX (IXa), its cofactor factor VIII (VIIIa), the substrate (factor X), and they are activated by negatively charged surfaces (such as glass, active platelet membrane, sometimes cell membrane of monocytes). These vitamin K-dependent procoagulant factors dock to this surface through their Gla domain with Ca^{2+} bridges.
