= Thrombodynamics test =

- Purpose: method for blood coagulation monitoring and anticoagulant control

Thrombodynamics test is a method for blood coagulation monitoring and anticoagulant control. This test is based on imitation of coagulation processes occurring in vivo, is sensitive both to pro- and anticoagulant changes in the hemostatic balance. Highly sensitive to thrombosis.

The method was developed in the Physical Biochemistry Laboratory under the direction of Prof. Fazly Ataullakhanov.

== Technology description ==
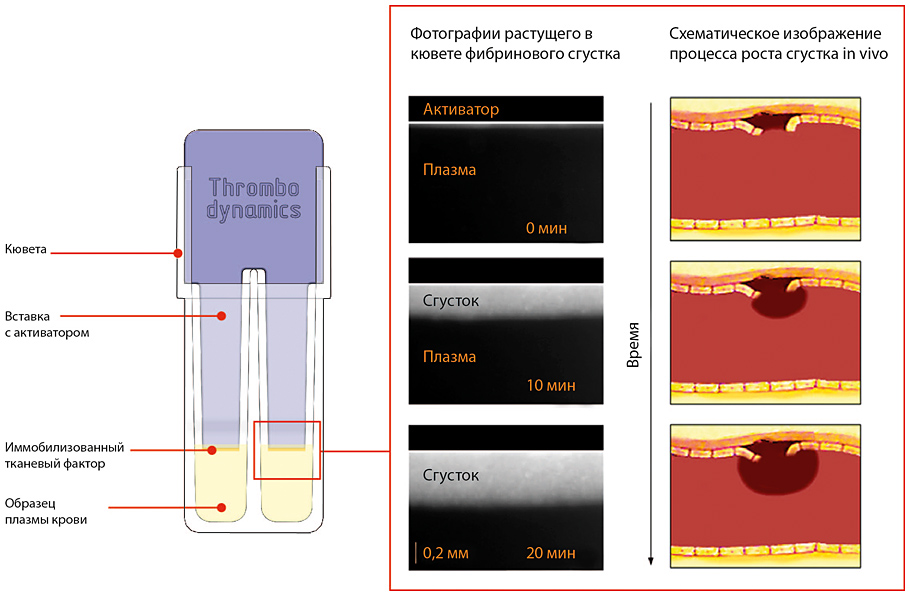
Thrombodynamics analyser scheme

Thrombodynamics designed to investigate the in vitro spatial-temporal dynamics of blood coagulation initiated by localized coagulation activator under conditions similar to the conditions of the blood clotting in vivo. Thrombodynamics takes into account the spatial heterogeneity trombodinamiki processes in blood coagulation. The test is performed without mixing in a thin layer of plasma.

The measurement cuvette with the blood plasma sample is placed inside the water thermostat. Clotting starts when activator with immobilized TF is immersed into the cuvette. The clot then propagates from the activating surface into the bulk of plasma. Image of growing clot is registered via the CCD camera using a time-lapse microscopy mode in scattered light and then parameters of coagulation are calculated on the computer. Thrombodynamics analyser T-2 device also supports measurement of spatial dynamics of thrombin propagation during the process of clot growth via usage of the fluorogenic substrate for thrombin. Blood plasma sample is periodically irradiated with the excitation light and the emission of the fluorophore is registered by CCD camera.

Mathematical methods are used to restore spatio-temporal distribution of the thrombin from the fluorophore signal. This experimental model worked well in research and has demonstrated good sensitivity to various disorders of the coagulation system.

== Features ==
- Observing spatial growth of fibrin clots in vitro
- Measuring thrombin generation as a function of space and time during thrombus formation
- Time- and space- resolved imaging of other active coagulation factors
- High sensitivity to both pro- and anticoagulant changes in the hemostatic balance

== Applications ==
- Prothrombotic disorders
- Hypercoagulation in the perioperative period, DIC, cancer patients, patients with thrombotic risk factors
  - Diagnostics of coagulopathy
  - Monitoring of anticoagulant therapy
  - Individual therapy planning
- Bleeding disorders
  - Hemophilia A and B, DIC, blood loss, anticoagulant overdose
  - Diagnostics of coagulopathy
  - Monitoring of replacement therapy
- Identification of coagulopathy pathogenesis
- Development of drugs and biomaterials

== See also ==
- Blood coagulation
