= PFA-100 =

Platelet function analyser

The PFA-100 (Platelet Function Assay or Platelet Function Analyser) is a platelet function analyser that aspirates blood in vitro from a blood specimen into disposable test cartridges through a microscopic aperture cut into a biologically active membrane at the end of a capillary. The membrane of the cartridges are coated with collagen and adenosine diphosphate (ADP) or collagen and epinephrine inducing a platelet plug to form which closes the aperture.

The PFA test result is dependent on platelet function, plasma von Willebrand Factor level, platelet number, and (to some extent) the hematocrit (that is, the percent composition of red blood cells in the sample). The PFA test is initially performed with the Collagen/Epinepherine membrane. A normal Col/Epi closure time (<180 seconds) excludes the presence of a significant platelet function defect. If the Col/Epi closure time is prolonged (>180 seconds), the Col/ADP test is automatically performed. If the Col/ADP result is normal (<120 seconds), aspirin-induced platelet dysfunction is most likely. Prolongation of both test results (Col/Epi >180 seconds, Col/ADP >120 seconds) may indicate the following;

- Anemia (hematocrit <0.28)
- Thrombocytopenia (platelet count < 100 x 10^{9}/L)
- A significant platelet function defect other than aspirin

Once anemia and thrombocytopenia have been excluded, further evaluation to exclude von Willebrand disease and inherited/acquired platelet dysfunction can be made.
