= Protein Z-related protease inhibitor =

Protein found in humans

SERPINA10

Identifiers
- Aliases: SERPINA10, PZI, ZPI, serpin family A member 10
- External IDs: OMIM: 605271; MGI: 2667725; GeneCards: SERPINA10
Available structures
| PDB | Ortholog search: PDBe RCSB |
| PDB | List of PDB id codes 3F1S, 3H5C, 4AFX, 4AJU |

Gene location (Human)
| Chr. | Chromosome 14 (human) |
| Band | 14q32.13 | Start | 94,280,460 bp |
| Band | 14q32.13 | End | 94,293,268 bp |

Gene location (Mouse)
| Chr. | Chromosome 12 (mouse) |
| Band | 12|12 E | Start | 103,581,045 bp |
| Band | 12|12 E | End | 103,597,703 bp |
RNA expression pattern
| Bgee | Human / Mouse (ortholog); Top expressed in: right lobe of liver; islet of Langerhans; right ovary; gastric mucosa; left ovary; ectocervix; muscle layer of sigmoid colon; canal of the cervix; right uterine tube; body of stomach / Top expressed in: left lobe of liver; islet of Langerhans; yolk sac; fetal liver hematopoietic progenitor cell; human fetus; mesenteric lymph nodes; sexually immature organism; gallbladder; abdominal wall; ureter; More reference expression data |
| BioGPS | n/a |
Gene ontology
| Molecular function | peptidase inhibitor activity; heparin binding; serine-type endopeptidase inhibitor activity |
| Cellular component | extracellular region; extracellular exosome; extracellular space; endoplasmic reticulum lumen |
| Biological process | hemostasis; bioluminescence; regulation of acrosome reaction; negative regulation of peptidase activity; blood coagulation; negative regulation of endopeptidase activity; post-translational protein modification |
Sources:Amigo / QuickGO
Orthologs
| Databases | NCBI: entry; OMA: entry |
| Species | Human | Mouse |
| Entrez | 51156 | 217847 |
| Ensembl | ENSG00000140093; ENSG00000278767 | ENSMUSG00000061947 |
| UniProt | Q9UK55 | Q8R121 |
| RefSeq (mRNA) | NM_001100607; NM_016186 | NM_001301404; NM_144834 |
| RefSeq (protein) | NP_001094077; NP_057270 | NP_001288333; NP_659083 |
| Location (UCSC) | Chr 14: 94.28 – 94.29 Mb | Chr 12: 103.58 – 103.6 Mb |
| PubMed search |
- Wikidata
| View/Edit Human | View/Edit Mouse |

Protein Z-dependent protease inhibitor (ZPI) is a protein that in humans is encoded by the gene SERPINA10. ZPI circulates in the blood and inhibits factors Xa and XIa of the coagulation cascade. It is a member of the class of the serine protease inhibitors (serpins). Its name implies that it requires protein Z, another circulating protein, to function properly, but this only applies to its inhibition of factor X.

It is about 72 kDa heavy and 444 amino acids large. It is produced by the liver.

== Role in disease ==
Water et al. found deficiency of ZPI in 4.4% of a cohort of patients with thrombophilia (a tendency to thrombosis).

== History ==
Han et al. first described ZPI in 1998. The same group further characterised it in 2000.
