= Coagulation =

Process of formation of blood clots

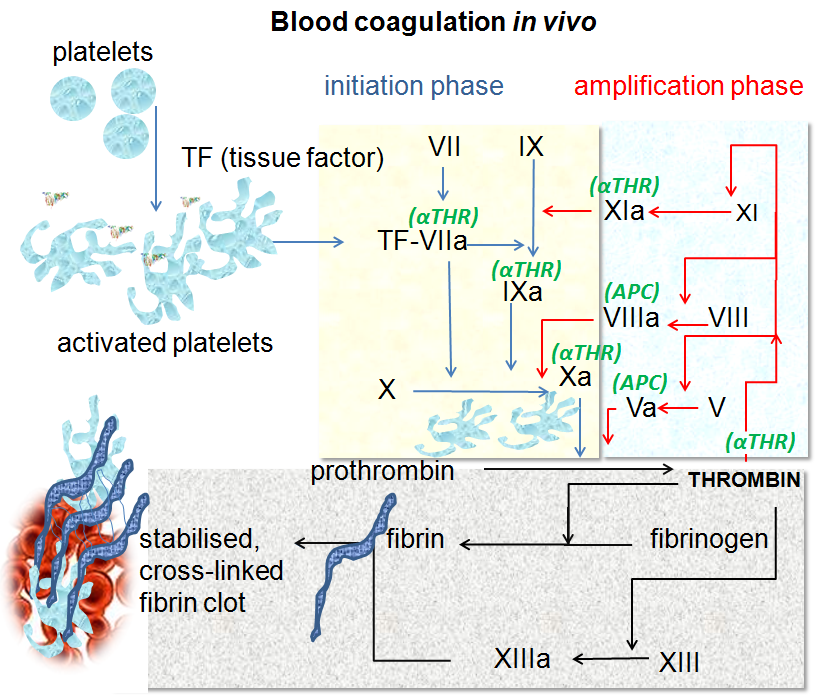
Blood coagulation pathways in vivo showing the central role played by thrombin

Coagulation, also known as clotting, is the process by which blood changes from a liquid to a gel forming a blood clot. The process involves activation, adhesion and aggregation of platelets, as well as deposition and maturation of fibrin. Coagulation results in hemostasis, the cessation of blood loss from a damaged vessel, allowing repair.

Coagulation begins almost instantly after an injury to the endothelium that lines a blood vessel. Exposure of blood to the subendothelial space initiates two processes: changes in platelets, and the exposure of subendothelial platelet tissue factor to coagulation factor VII, which ultimately leads to cross-linked fibrin formation. Platelets immediately form a plug at the site of injury; this is called primary hemostasis. Secondary hemostasis occurs simultaneously: additional coagulation factors beyond factor VII (listed below) respond in a cascade to form fibrin strands, which strengthen the platelet plug.

Coagulation is highly conserved throughout biology. In all mammals, coagulation involves both cellular components (platelets) and proteinaceous components (coagulation or clotting factors). The pathway in humans has been the most extensively researched and is the best understood. Disorders of coagulation can result in problems with hemorrhage, bruising, or thrombosis.

== List of coagulation factors ==
There are 13 traditional clotting factors, as named below, and other substances necessary for coagulation:

Coagulation factors and related substances
Number/Name	Synonym(s)	Function	Associated genetic disorders	Type of molecule	Source	Pathway(s)
Factor I	Fibrinogen	Forms fibrin threads in blood clots	Congenital afibrinogenemia; Familial renal amyloidosis	Plasma protein	Liver	Common pathway; converted into fibrin
Factor II*	Prothrombin	Its active form (IIa) activates platelets, factors I, V, VII, VIII, XI, XIII, protein C	Thrombophilia; Prothrombin thrombophilia (Prothrombin G20210A)	Plasma protein	Liver	Common pathway; converted into thrombin
Factor III	Tissue factor; tissue thromboplastin	Co-factor of factor VIIa, which was formerly known as factor III		Lipoprotein mixture	Damaged cells and platelets	Extrinsic
Factor IV	Calcium; Calcium ions; Ca^{2+} ions	Required for coagulation factors to bind to phospholipids, which were formerly known as factor IV		Inorganic ions in plasma	Diet, platelets, bone matrix	Entire process of coagulation
Factor V	Proaccelerin; labile factor; Ac-globulin	Co-factor of factor X with which it forms the prothrombinase complex	Activated protein C resistance	Plasma protein	Liver, platelets	Extrinsic and intrinsic
Factor VI	Unassigned – old name of factor Va (activated form of factor V); accelerin (formerly)	N/A	N/A	N/A		
Factor VII*	Proconvertin; Serum Prothrombin Conversion Accelerator (SPCA); Stable factor	Activates factors IX, X; increases rate of catalytic conversion of prothrombin into thrombin	Congenital factor VII deficiency	Plasma protein	Liver	Extrinsic
Factor VIII	Antihemophilic factor A; Antihemophilic factor (AHF); Antihemophilic globulin (AHG)	Co-factor of factor IX with which it forms the tenase complex	Hemophilia A	Plasma protein factor	Platelets and endothelial cells	Intrinsic
Factor IX*	Antihemophilic factor B; Christmas factor; plasma thromboplastin component (PTC)	Activates factor X, forms tenase complex with factor VIII	Hemophilia B	Plasma protein	Liver	Intrinsic
Factor X*	Stuart-Prower factor; Stuart factor	Activates factor II, forms prothrombinase complex with factor V	Congenital factor X deficiency	Protein	Liver	Extrinsic and intrinsic
Factor XI	Plasma thromboplastin antecedent (PTA); Antihemophilic factor C	Activates factor IX	Hemophilia C	Plasma protein	Liver	Intrinsic
Factor XII	Hageman factor	Activates XI, VII, prekallikrein and plasminogen	Hereditary angioedema type III	Plasma protein	Liver	Intrinsic; initiates clotting in vitro; also activates plasmin
Factor XIII	Fibrin-stabilizing factor	Crosslinks fibrin threads	Congenital factor XIIIa/b deficiency	Plasma protein	Liver, platelets	Common pathway; stabilizes fibrin; slows down fibrinolysis
Vitamin K	Clotting vitamin	Essential factor to the hepatic gamma-glutamyl carboxylase that adds a carboxyl group to glutamic acid residues on factors II, VII, IX and X, as well as Protein S, Protein C and Protein Z	Vitamin K deficiency	Phytyl-substituted naphthoquinone derivative	Gut microbiota (e.g. E. coli), dietary sources	Extrinsic
von Willebrand factor		Binds to VIII, mediates platelet adhesion	von Willebrand disease	Blood glycoprotein	Blood vessels' endothelia, bone marrow	
Prekallikrein	Fletcher factor	Activates XII and prekallikrein; cleaves HMWK	Prekallikrein/Fletcher factor deficiency			
Kallikrein		Activates plasminogen				
High-molecular-weight kininogen	Fitzgerald factor; HMWK	Supports reciprocal activation of factors XII, XI, and prekallikrein	Kininogen deficiency			
Fibronectin		Mediates cell adhesion	Glomerulopathy with fibronectin deposits			
Antithrombin III		Inhibits factors IIa, Xa, IXa, XIa, and XIIa	Antithrombin III deficiency			
Heparin cofactor II		Inhibits factor IIa, cofactor for heparin and dermatan sulfate ("minor antithrombin")	Heparin cofactor II deficiency			
Protein C		Inactivates factors Va and VIIIa	Protein C deficiency			
Protein S		Cofactor for activated protein C (APC), inactive when bound to C4b-binding protein	Protein S deficiency			
Protein Z		Mediates thrombin adhesion to phospholipids and stimulates degradation of factor X by ZPI	Protein Z deficiency			
Protein Z-related protease inhibitor	ZPI	Degrades factors X (in presence of protein Z) and XI (independently				
Plasminogen		Converts to plasmin, lyses fibrin and other proteins	Plasminogen deficiency type I (ligneous conjunctivitis)			
α_{2}-Antiplasmin		Inhibits plasmin	Antiplasmin deficiency			
α_{2}-Macroglobulin		Inhibits plasmin, kallikrein, and thrombin				
Tissue plasminogen activator	t-PA or TPA	Activates plasminogen	Familial hyperfibrinolysis; Thrombophilia			
Urokinase		Activates plasminogen	Quebec platelet disorder			
Plasminogen activator inhibitor-1	PAI-1	Inactivates tPA and urokinase (endothelial PAI	Plasminogen activator inhibitor-1 deficiency			
Plasminogen activator inhibitor-2	PAI-2	Inactivates tPA and urokinase	Plasminogen activator inhibitor-1 deficiency			
Cancer procoagulant		Pathological activator of factor X; linked to thrombosis in various cancers				
* Vitamin K is required for biosynthesis of these clotting factors

== Physiology ==
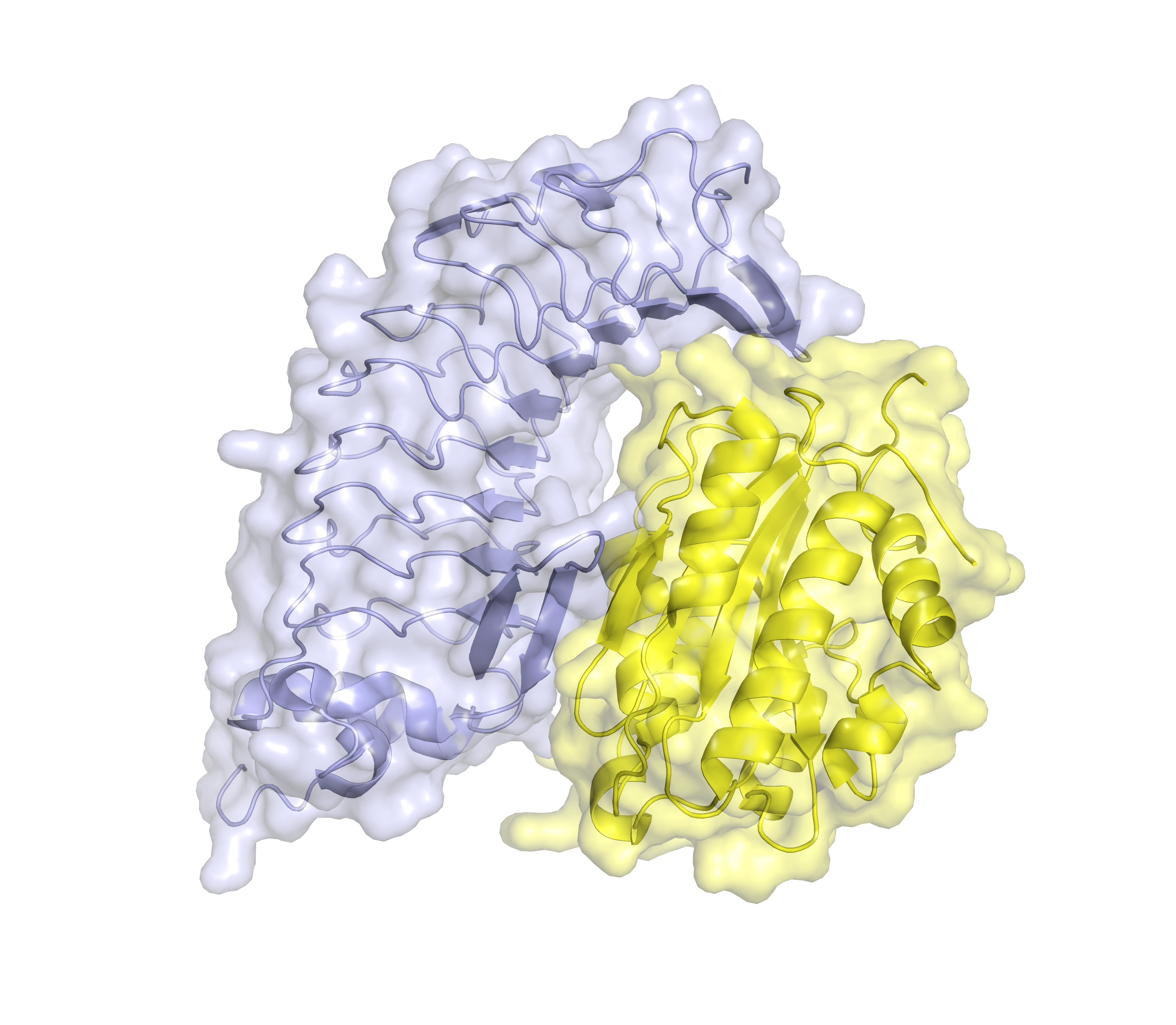
The interaction of vWF and GP1b alpha. The GP1b receptor on the surface of platelets allows the platelet to bind to vWF, which is exposed upon damage to vasculature. The vWF A1 domain (yellow) interacts with the extracellular domain of GP1ba (blue).

Physiology of blood coagulation is based on hemostasis, the normal bodily process that stops bleeding. Coagulation is a part of an integrated series of haemostatic reactions, involving plasma, platelet, and vascular components.

Hemostasis consists of four main stages:

- Vasoconstriction (vasospasm or vascular spasm): Here, this refers to contraction of smooth muscles in the tunica media layer of endothelium (blood vessel wall).
- Activation of platelets and platelet plug formation:
  - Platelet activation: Platelet activators, such as platelet activating factor and thromboxane A2, activate platelets in the bloodstream, leading to attachment of platelets' membrane receptors (e.g. glycoprotein IIb/IIIa) to extracellular matrix proteins (e.g. von Willebrand factor) on cell membranes of damaged endothelial cells and exposed collagen at the site of injury.
  - Platelet plug formation: The adhered platelets aggregate and form a temporary plug to stop bleeding. This process is often called "primary hemostasis".
- Coagulation cascade: It is a series of enzymatic reactions that lead to the formation of a stable blood clot. The endothelial cells release substances like tissue factor, which triggers the extrinsic pathway of the coagulation cascade. This is called as "secondary hemostasis".
- Fibrin clot formation: Near the end of the extrinsic pathway, after thrombin completes conversion of fibrinogen into fibrin, factor XIIIa (plasma transglutaminase; activated form of fibrin-stabilizing factor) promotes fibrin cross-linking, and subsequent stabilization of fibrin, leading to the formation of a fibrin clot (final blood clot), which temporarily seals the wound to allow wound healing until its inner part is dissolved by fibrinolytic enzymes, while the clot's outer part is shed off.

After the fibrin clot is formed, clot retraction occurs and then clot resolution starts, and these two process are together called "tertiary hemostasis". Activated platelets contract their internal actin and myosin fibrils in their cytoskeleton, which leads to shrinkage of the clot volume. Plasminogen activators, such as tissue plasminogen activator (t-PA), activate plasminogen into plasmin, which promotes lysis of the fibrin clot; this restores the flow of blood in the damaged/obstructed blood vessels.

=== Vasoconstriction ===
When there is an injury to a blood vessel, the endothelial cells can release various vasoconstrictor substances, such as endothelin and thromboxane, to induce the constriction of the smooth muscles in the vessel wall. This helps reduce blood flow to the site of injury and limits bleeding.

=== Platelet activation and platelet plug formation ===
When the endothelium is damaged, the normally isolated underlying collagen is exposed to circulating platelets, which bind directly to collagen with collagen-specific glycoprotein Ia/IIa surface receptors. This adhesion is strengthened further by von Willebrand factor (vWF), which is released from the endothelium and from platelets; vWF forms additional links between the platelets' glycoprotein Ib/IX/V and A1 domain. This localization of platelets to the extracellular matrix promotes collagen interaction with platelet glycoprotein VI. Binding of collagen to glycoprotein VI triggers a signaling cascade that results in activation of platelet integrins. Activated integrins mediate tight binding of platelets to the extracellular matrix. This process adheres platelets to the site of injury.

Activated platelets release the contents of stored granules into the blood plasma. The granules include ADP, serotonin, platelet-activating factor (PAF), vWF, platelet factor 4, and thromboxane A_{2} (TXA_{2}), which, in turn, activate additional platelets. The granules' contents activate a G_{q}-linked protein receptor cascade, resulting in increased calcium concentration in the platelets' cytosol. The calcium activates protein kinase C, which, in turn, activates phospholipase A_{2} (PLA_{2}). PLA_{2} then modifies the integrin membrane glycoprotein IIb/IIIa, increasing its affinity to bind fibrinogen. The activated platelets change shape from spherical to stellate, and the fibrinogen cross-links with glycoprotein IIb/IIIa aid in aggregation of adjacent platelets, forming a platelet plug and thereby completing primary hemostasis).

=== Coagulation cascade ===
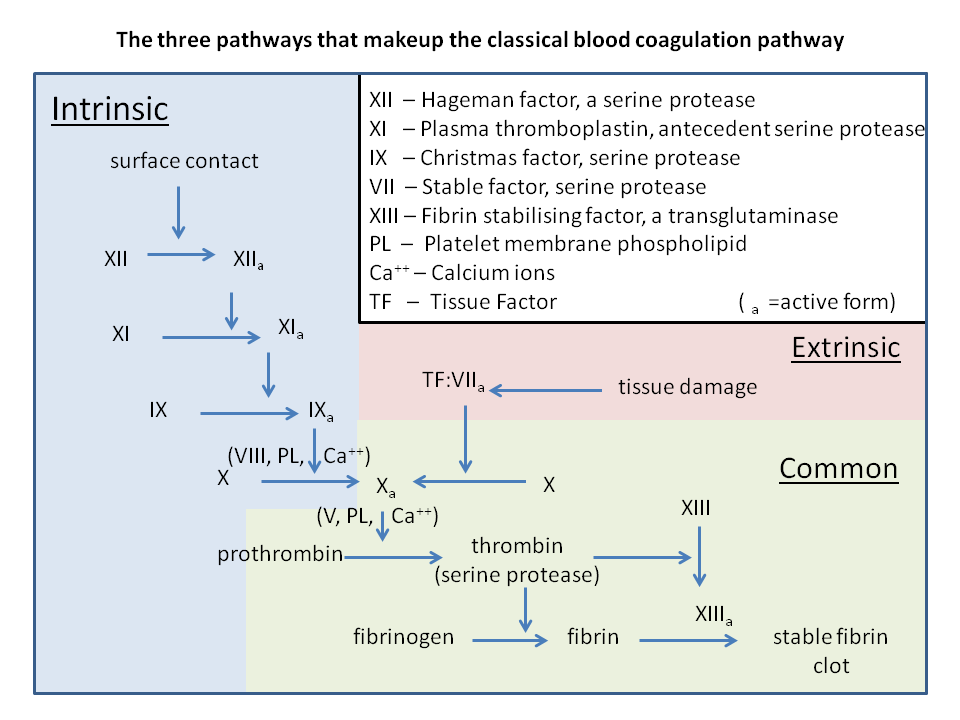
The classical blood coagulation pathway

Modern coagulation pathway. Hand-drawn composite from similar drawings presented by Professor Dzung Le, MD, PhD, at UCSD Clinical Chemistry conferences on 14 and 21 October 2014. Original schema from Introduction to Hematology by Samuel I. Rapaport. 2nd ed.; Lippincott: 1987. Dr Le added the factor XI portion based on a paper from about year 2000. Dr. Le's similar drawings presented the development of this cascade over 6 frames, like a comic.

The coagulation cascade of secondary hemostasis has two initial pathways which lead to fibrin formation. These are the contact activation pathway (also known as the intrinsic pathway), and the tissue factor pathway (also known as the extrinsic pathway), which both lead to the same fundamental reactions that produce fibrin. It was previously thought that the two pathways of coagulation cascade were of equal importance, but it is now known that the primary pathway for the initiation of blood coagulation is the tissue factor (extrinsic) pathway. The pathways are a series of reactions, in which a zymogen (inactive enzyme precursor) of a serine protease and its glycoprotein co-factor are activated to become active components that then catalyze the next reaction in the cascade, ultimately resulting in cross-linked fibrin. Coagulation factors are generally indicated by Roman numerals, with a lowercase a appended to indicate an active form.

The coagulation factors are generally enzymes called serine proteases, which act by cleaving downstream proteins. The exceptions are tissue factor, FIV, FV, FVIII, FXIII. Tissue factor, FV, and FVIII are glycoproteins; Factor IV is a calcium ion; and Factor XIII is a transglutaminase. The coagulation factors circulate as inactive zymogens. The coagulation cascade is therefore classically divided into three pathways. The tissue factor and contact activation pathways both activate the "final common pathway" of factor X, thrombin and fibrin.

==== Tissue factor pathway (extrinsic) ====
The main role of the tissue factor (TF) pathway is to generate a "thrombin burst", a process by which thrombin, the most important constituent of the coagulation cascade in terms of its feedback activation roles, is released very rapidly. FVIIa circulates in a higher amount than any other activated coagulation factor. The process includes the following steps:

1. Following damage to the blood vessel, FVII leaves the circulation and comes into contact with tissue factor expressed on tissue-factor-bearing cells (stromal fibroblasts and leukocytes), forming an activated complex (TF-FVIIa).
2. TF-FVIIa activates FIX and FX.
3. FVII is itself activated by thrombin, FXIa, FXII, and FXa.
4. The activation of FX (to form FXa) by TF-FVIIa is almost immediately inhibited by tissue factor pathway inhibitor (TFPI).
5. FXa and its co-factor FVa form the prothrombinase complex, which activates prothrombin to thrombin.
6. Thrombin then activates other components of the coagulation cascade, including FV and FVIII (which forms a complex with FIX), and activates and releases FVIII from being bound to vWF.
7. FVIIIa is the co-factor of FIXa, and together they form the "tenase" complex, which activates FX; and so the cycle continues. ("Tenase" is a contraction of "ten" and the suffix "-ase" used for enzymes.)

==== Contact activation pathway (intrinsic) ====
The contact activation pathway begins with formation of the primary complex on collagen by high-molecular-weight kininogen (HMWK), prekallikrein, and FXII (Hageman factor). Prekallikrein is converted to kallikrein and FXII becomes FXIIa. FXIIa converts FXI into FXIa. Factor XIa activates FIX, which with its co-factor FVIIIa form the tenase complex, which activates FX to FXa. The minor role that the contact activation pathway has in initiating blood clot formation (or more specifically, physiological hemostasis) can be illustrated by the fact that individuals with severe deficiencies of FXII, HMWK, and prekallikrein do not have a bleeding disorder. Instead, contact activation system seems to be more involved in inflammation, and innate immunity. Interference with the pathway may confer protection against thrombosis without a significant bleeding risk.

Inhibition of factor XII and PK interferes with innate immunity in animal models. More promising is inhibition of factor XI, which in early clinical trials have shown the expected effect.

==== Final common pathway ====
The division of coagulation in two pathways is arbitrary, originating from laboratory tests in which clotting times were measured either after the clotting was initiated by glass, the intrinsic pathway; or clotting was initiated by thromboplastin (a mix of tissue factor and phospholipids), the extrinsic pathway.

Further, the final common pathway scheme implies that prothrombin is converted to thrombin only when acted upon by the intrinsic or extrinsic pathways, which is an oversimplification. In fact, thrombin is generated by activated platelets at the initiation of the platelet plug, which in turn promotes more platelet activation.

Thrombin functions not only to convert fibrinogen to fibrin, it also activates Factors VIII and V and their inhibitor protein C (in the presence of thrombomodulin). By activating Factor XIII, covalent bonds are formed that crosslink the fibrin polymers that form from activated monomers. This stabilizes the fibrin network.

The coagulation cascade is maintained in a prothrombotic state by the continued activation of FVIII and FIX to form the tenase complex until it is down-regulated by the anticoagulant pathways.

==== Cell-based scheme of coagulation ====
A newer model of coagulation mechanism explains the intricate combination of cellular and biochemical events that occur during the coagulation process in vivo. Along with the procoagulant and anticoagulant plasma proteins, normal physiologic coagulation requires the presence of two cell types for formation of coagulation complexes: cells that express tissue factor (usually extravascular) and platelets.

The coagulation process occurs in two phases. First is the initiation phase, which occurs in tissue-factor-expressing cells. This is followed by the propagation phase, which occurs on activated platelets. The initiation phase, mediated by the tissue factor exposure, proceeds via the classic extrinsic pathway and contributes to about 5% of thrombin production. The amplified production of thrombin occurs via the classic intrinsic pathway in the propagation phase; about 95% of thrombin generated will be during this second phase.

=== Fibrinolysis ===
Eventually, blood clots are reorganized and resorbed by a process termed fibrinolysis. The main enzyme responsible for this process is plasmin, which is regulated by plasmin activators and plasmin inhibitors.

=== Role in immune system ===
The coagulation system overlaps with the immune system. Coagulation can physically trap invading microbes in blood clots. Also, some products of the coagulation system can contribute to the innate immune system by their ability to increase vascular permeability and act as chemotactic agents for phagocytic cells. In addition, some of the products of the coagulation system are directly antimicrobial. For example, beta-lysine, an amino acid produced by platelets during coagulation, can cause lysis of many Gram-positive bacteria by acting as a cationic detergent. Many acute-phase proteins of inflammation are involved in the coagulation system. In addition, pathogenic bacteria may secrete agents that alter the coagulation system, e.g. coagulase and streptokinase.

Immunohemostasis is the integration of immune activation into adaptive clot formation. Immunothrombosis is the pathological result of crosstalk between immunity, inflammation, and coagulation. Mediators of this process include damage-associated molecular patterns and pathogen-associated molecular patterns, which are recognized by toll-like receptors, triggering procoagulant and proinflammatory responses such as formation of neutrophil extracellular traps.

=== Cofactors ===
Various substances are required for the proper functioning of the coagulation cascade:

==== Calcium and phospholipids ====
Calcium and phospholipids (constituents of platelet membrane) are required for the tenase and prothrombinase complexes to function. Calcium mediates the binding of the complexes via the terminal gamma-carboxy residues on Factor Xa and Factor IXa to the phospholipid surfaces expressed by platelets, as well as procoagulant microparticles or microvesicles shed from them. Calcium is also required at other points in the coagulation cascade. Calcium ions play a major role in the regulation of coagulation cascade that is paramount in the maintenance of hemostasis. Other than platelet activation, calcium ions are responsible for complete activation of several coagulation factors, including coagulation Factor XIII.

==== Vitamin K ====
Vitamin K is an essential factor to the hepatic gamma-glutamyl carboxylase that adds a carboxyl group to glutamic acid residues on factors II, VII, IX and X, as well as Protein S, Protein C and Protein Z. In adding the gamma-carboxyl group to glutamate residues on the immature clotting factors, Vitamin K is itself oxidized. Another enzyme, Vitamin K epoxide reductase (VKORC), reduces vitamin K back to its active form. Vitamin K epoxide reductase is pharmacologically important as a target of anticoagulant drugs warfarin and related coumarins such as acenocoumarol, phenprocoumon, and dicumarol. These drugs create a deficiency of reduced vitamin K by blocking VKORC, thereby inhibiting maturation of clotting factors. Vitamin K deficiency from other causes (e.g., in malabsorption) or impaired vitamin K metabolism in disease (e.g., in liver failure) lead to the formation of PIVKAs (proteins formed in vitamin K absence), which are partially or totally non-gamma carboxylated, affecting the coagulation factors' ability to bind to phospholipid.

=== Regulators ===
Coagulation with arrows for negative and positive feedback.

Several mechanisms keep platelet activation and the coagulation cascade in check. Abnormalities can lead to an increased tendency toward thrombosis:

==== Protein C and Protein S ====
Protein C is a major physiological anticoagulant. It is a vitamin K-dependent serine protease enzyme that is activated by thrombin into activated protein C (APC). Protein C is activated in a sequence that starts with Protein C and thrombin binding to a cell surface protein thrombomodulin. Thrombomodulin binds these proteins in such a way that it activates Protein C. The activated form, along with protein S and a phospholipid as cofactors, degrades FVa and FVIIIa. Quantitative or qualitative deficiency of either (protein C or protein S) may lead to thrombophilia (a tendency to develop thrombosis). Impaired action of Protein C (activated Protein C resistance), for example by having the "Leiden" variant of Factor V or high levels of FVIII, also may lead to a thrombotic tendency.

==== Antithrombin ====
Antithrombin is a serine protease inhibitor (serpin) that degrades the serine proteases: thrombin, FIXa, FXa, FXIa, and FXIIa. It is constantly active, but its adhesion to these factors is increased by the presence of heparan sulfate (a glycosaminoglycan) or the administration of heparins (different heparinoids increase affinity to FXa, thrombin, or both). Quantitative or qualitative deficiency of antithrombin (inborn or acquired, e.g., in proteinuria) leads to thrombophilia.

==== Tissue factor pathway inhibitor (TFPI) ====
Tissue factor pathway inhibitor (TFPI) limits the action of tissue factor (TF). It also inhibits excessive TF-mediated activation of FVII and FX.

==== Plasmin ====
Plasmin is generated by proteolytic cleavage of plasminogen, a plasma protein synthesized in the liver. This cleavage is catalyzed by tissue plasminogen activator (t-PA), which is synthesized and secreted by endothelium. Plasmin proteolytically cleaves fibrin into fibrin degradation products that inhibit excessive fibrin formation.

==== Prostacyclin ====
Prostacyclin (PGI_{2}) is released by endothelium and activates platelet G_{s} protein-linked receptors. This, in turn, activates adenylyl cyclase, which synthesizes cAMP. cAMP inhibits platelet activation by decreasing cytosolic levels of calcium and, by doing so, inhibits the release of granules that would lead to activation of additional platelets and the coagulation cascade.

== Medical assessment ==
Numerous medical tests are used to assess the function of the coagulation system:

- Common: aPTT, PT (also used to determine INR), fibrinogen testing (often by the Clauss fibrinogen assay), platelet count, platelet function testing (often by PFA-100), thrombodynamics test.
- Other: TCT, bleeding time, mixing test (whether an abnormality corrects if the patient's plasma is mixed with normal plasma), coagulation factor assays, antiphospholipid antibodies, D-dimer, genetic tests (e.g. factor V Leiden, prothrombin mutation G20210A), dilute Russell's viper venom time (dRVVT), miscellaneous platelet function tests, thromboelastography (TEG or Sonoclot), euglobulin lysis time (ELT).

The contact activation (intrinsic) pathway is initiated by activation of the contact activation system, and can be measured by the activated partial thromboplastin time (aPTT) test.

The tissue factor (extrinsic) pathway is initiated by release of tissue factor (a specific cellular lipoprotein), and can be measured by the prothrombin time (PT) test. PT results are often reported as ratio (INR value) to monitor dosing of oral anticoagulants such as warfarin.

The quantitative and qualitative screening of fibrinogen is measured by the thrombin clotting time (TCT). Measurement of the exact amount of fibrinogen present in the blood is generally done using the Clauss fibrinogen assay. Many analysers are capable of measuring a "derived fibrinogen" level from the graph of the Prothrombin time clot.

If a coagulation factor is part of the contact activation or tissue factor pathway, a deficiency of that factor will affect only one of the tests: Thus hemophilia A, a deficiency of factor VIII, which is part of the contact activation pathway, results in an abnormally prolonged aPTT test but a normal PT test. Deficiencies of common pathway factors prothrombin, fibrinogen, FX, and FV will prolong both aPTT and PT. If an abnormal PT or aPTT is present, additional testing will occur to determine which (if any) factor is present as aberrant concentrations.

Deficiencies of fibrinogen (quantitative or qualitative) will prolong PT, aPTT, thrombin time, and reptilase time.

== Role in disease ==
Coagulation defects may cause hemorrhage or thrombosis, and occasionally both, depending on the nature of the defect.

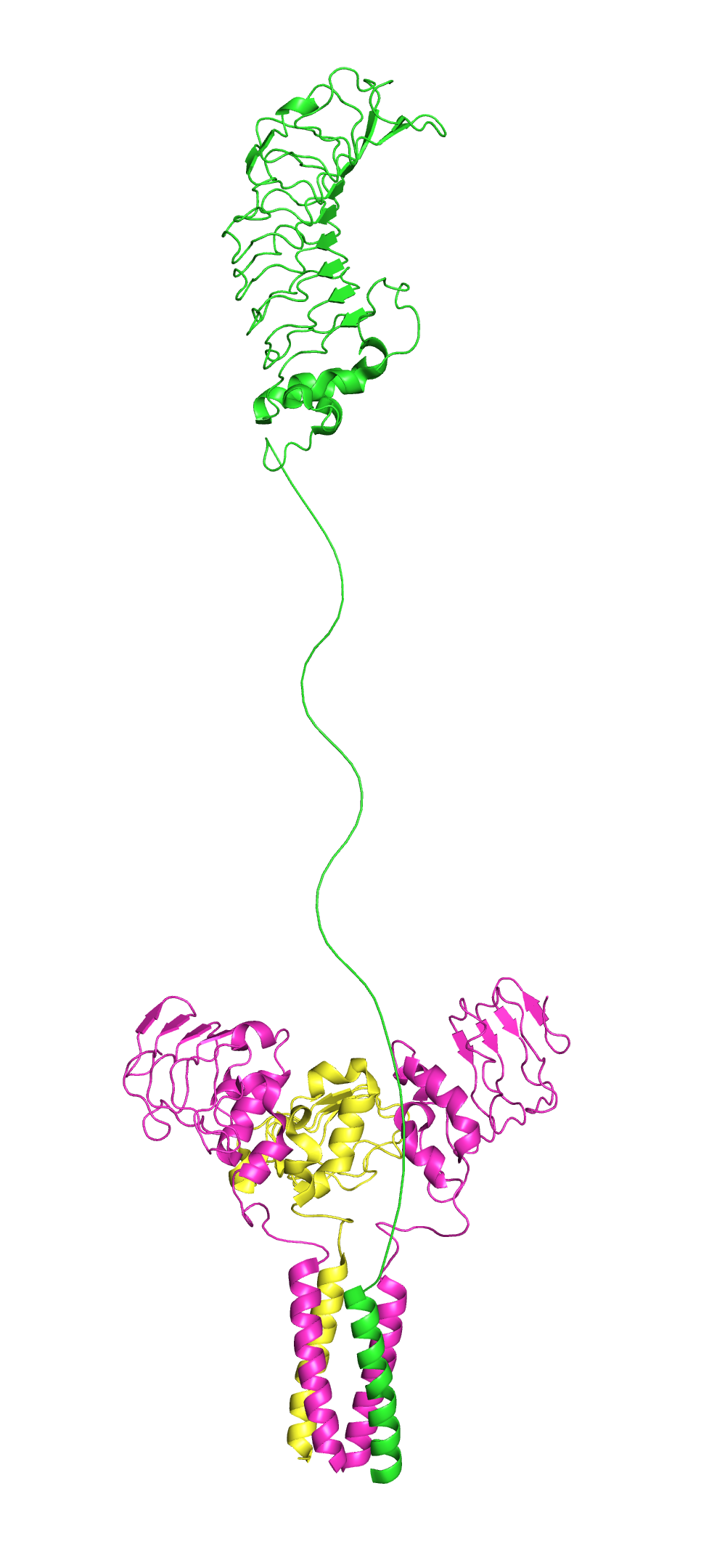
The GP1b-IX receptor complex. This protein receptor complex is found on the surface of platelets, and in conjunction with GPV allows for platelets to adhere to the site of injury. Mutations in the genes associated with the glycoprotein Ib-IX-V complex are characteristic of Bernard–Soulier syndrome.

=== Platelet disorders ===
Platelet disorders are either congenital or acquired. Examples of congenital platelet disorders are Glanzmann's thrombasthenia, Bernard–Soulier syndrome (abnormal glycoprotein Ib-IX-V complex), gray platelet syndrome (deficient alpha granules), and delta storage pool deficiency (deficient dense granules). Most are rare. They predispose to hemorrhage. Von Willebrand disease is due to deficiency or abnormal function of von Willebrand factor, and leads to a similar bleeding pattern; its milder forms are relatively common.

Decreased platelet numbers (thrombocytopenia) is due to insufficient production (e.g., myelodysplastic syndrome or other bone marrow disorders), destruction by the immune system (immune thrombocytopenic purpura), or consumption (e.g., thrombotic thrombocytopenic purpura, hemolytic-uremic syndrome, paroxysmal nocturnal hemoglobinuria, disseminated intravascular coagulation, heparin-induced thrombocytopenia). An increase in platelet count is called thrombocytosis, which may lead to formation of thromboembolisms; however, thrombocytosis may be associated with increased risk of either thrombosis or hemorrhage in patients with myeloproliferative neoplasm.

=== Coagulation factor disorders ===
The best-known coagulation factor disorders are the hemophilias. The three main forms are hemophilia A (factor VIII deficiency), hemophilia B (factor IX deficiency or "Christmas disease") and hemophilia C (factor XI deficiency, mild bleeding tendency).

Von Willebrand disease (which behaves more like a platelet disorder except in severe cases), is the most common hereditary bleeding disorder and is characterized as being inherited autosomal recessive or dominant. In this disease, there is a defect in von Willebrand factor (vWF), which mediates the binding of glycoprotein Ib (GPIb) to collagen. This binding helps mediate the activation of platelets and formation of primary hemostasis.

In acute or chronic liver failure, there is insufficient production of coagulation factors, possibly increasing risk of bleeding during surgery.

Thrombosis is the pathological development of blood clots. These clots may break free and become mobile, forming an embolus or grow to such a size that occludes the vessel in which it developed. An embolism is said to occur when the thrombus (blood clot) becomes a mobile embolus and migrates to another part of the body, interfering with blood circulation and hence impairing organ function downstream of the occlusion. This causes ischemia and often leads to ischemic necrosis of tissue. Most cases of venous thrombosis are due to acquired states (older age, surgery, cancer, immobility). Unprovoked venous thrombosis may be related to inherited thrombophilias (e.g., factor V Leiden, antithrombin deficiency, and various other genetic deficiencies or variants), particularly in younger patients with family history of thrombosis; however, thrombotic events are more likely when acquired risk factors are superimposed on the inherited state.

== Pharmacology ==
=== Procoagulants ===
The use of adsorbent chemicals, such as zeolites, and other hemostatic agents are also used for sealing severe injuries quickly (such as in traumatic bleeding secondary to gunshot wounds). Thrombin and fibrin glue are used surgically to treat bleeding and to thrombose aneurysms. Hemostatic Powder Spray TC-325 is used to treated gastrointestinal bleeding.

Desmopressin is used to improve platelet function by activating arginine vasopressin receptor 1A.

Coagulation factor concentrates are used to treat hemophilia, to reverse the effects of anticoagulants, and to treat bleeding in people with impaired coagulation factor synthesis or increased consumption. Prothrombin complex concentrate, cryoprecipitate and fresh frozen plasma are commonly used coagulation factor products. Recombinant activated human factor VII is sometimes used in the treatment of major bleeding.

Tranexamic acid and aminocaproic acid inhibit fibrinolysis and lead to a de facto reduced bleeding rate. Before its withdrawal, aprotinin was used in some forms of major surgery to decrease bleeding risk and the need for blood products.

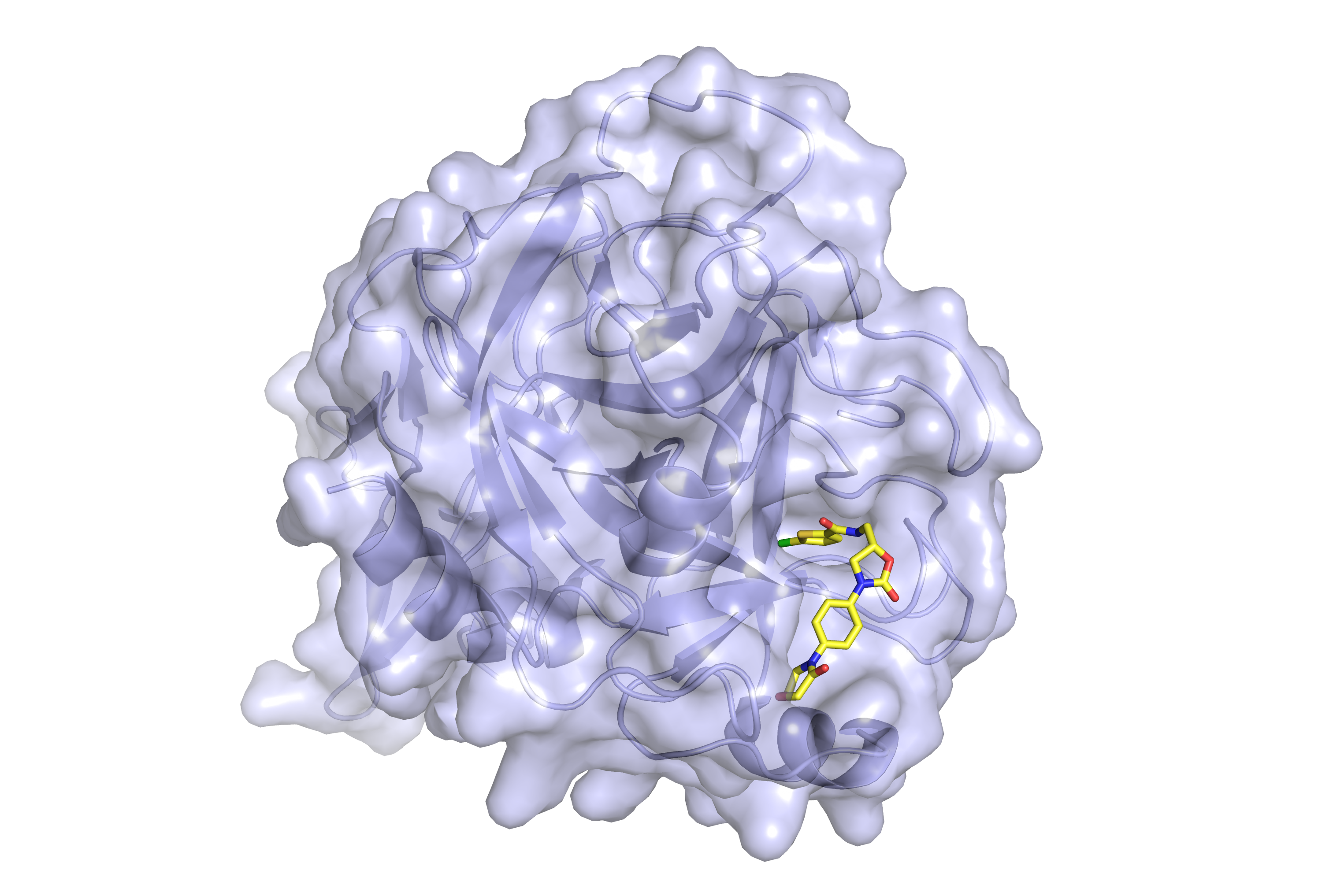
Rivaroxaban drug bound to the coagulation factor Xa. The drug prevents this protein from activating the coagulation pathway by inhibiting its enzymatic activity.

=== Anticoagulants ===
Anticoagulants and anti-platelet agents (together "antithrombotics") are amongst the most commonly used medications. Anti-platelet agents include aspirin, dipyridamole, ticlopidine, clopidogrel, ticagrelor and prasugrel; the parenteral glycoprotein IIb/IIIa inhibitors are used during angioplasty. Of the anticoagulants, warfarin (and related coumarins) and heparin are the most commonly used. Warfarin affects the vitamin K-dependent clotting factors (II, VII, IX, X) and protein C and protein S, whereas heparin and related compounds increase the action of antithrombin on thrombin and factor Xa. A newer class of drugs, the direct thrombin inhibitors, is under development; some members are already in clinical use (such as lepirudin, argatroban, bivalirudin and dabigatran). Also in clinical use are other small molecular compounds that interfere directly with the enzymatic action of particular coagulation factors (the directly acting oral anticoagulants: dabigatran, rivaroxaban, apixaban, and edoxaban).

== History ==
=== Initial discoveries ===
Theories on the coagulation of blood have existed since antiquity. Physiologist Johannes Müller (1801–1858) described fibrin, the substance of a thrombus. Its soluble precursor, fibrinogen, was thus named by Rudolf Virchow (1821–1902), and isolated chemically by Prosper Sylvain Denis (1799–1863). Alexander Schmidt suggested that the conversion from fibrinogen to fibrin is the result of an enzymatic process, and labeled the hypothetical enzyme "thrombin" and its precursor "prothrombin". Arthus discovered in 1890 that calcium was essential in coagulation. Platelets were identified in 1865, and their function was elucidated by Giulio Bizzozero in 1882.

The theory that thrombin is generated by the presence of tissue factor was consolidated by Paul Morawitz in 1905. At this stage, it was known that thrombokinase/thromboplastin (factor III) is released by damaged tissues, reacting with prothrombin (II), which, together with calcium (IV), forms thrombin, which converts fibrinogen into fibrin (I).

=== Coagulation factors ===
The remainder of the biochemical factors in the process of coagulation were largely discovered in the 20th century.

A first clue as to the actual complexity of the system of coagulation was the discovery of proaccelerin (initially and later called Factor V) by Paul Owren (1905–1990) in 1947. He also postulated its function to be the generation of accelerin (Factor VI), which later turned out to be the activated form of V (or Va); hence, VI is not now in active use.

Factor VII (also known as serum prothrombin conversion accelerator or proconvertin, precipitated by barium sulfate) was discovered in a young female patient in 1949 and 1951 by different groups.

Factor VIII turned out to be deficient in the clinically recognized but etiologically elusive hemophilia A; it was identified in the 1950s and is alternatively called antihemophilic globulin due to its capability to correct hemophilia A.

Factor IX was discovered in 1952 in a young patient with hemophilia B named Stephen Christmas (1947–1993). His deficiency was described by Dr. Rosemary Biggs and Professor R.G. MacFarlane in Oxford, UK. The factor is, hence, called Christmas Factor. Christmas lived in Canada and campaigned for blood transfusion safety until succumbing to transfusion-related AIDS at age 46. An alternative name for the factor is plasma thromboplastin component, given by an independent group in California.

Hageman factor, now known as factor XII, was identified in 1955 in an asymptomatic patient with a prolonged bleeding time named of John Hageman. Factor X, or Stuart-Prower factor, followed, in 1956. This protein was identified in a Ms. Audrey Prower of London, who had a lifelong bleeding tendency. In 1957, an American group identified the same factor in a Mr. Rufus Stuart. Factors XI and XIII were identified in 1953 and 1961, respectively.

The view that the coagulation process is a "cascade" or "waterfall" was enunciated almost simultaneously by MacFarlane in the UK and by Davie and Ratnoff in the US, respectively.

=== Nomenclature ===
The usage of Roman numerals rather than eponyms or systematic names was agreed upon during annual conferences (starting in 1955) of hemostasis experts. In 1962, consensus was achieved on the numbering of factors I–XII. This committee evolved into the present-day International Committee on Thrombosis and Hemostasis (ICTH). Assignment of numerals ceased in 1963 after the naming of Factor XIII. The names Fletcher Factor and Fitzgerald Factor were given to further coagulation-related proteins, namely prekallikrein and high-molecular-weight kininogen, respectively.

Factor VI is unassigned, as accelerin was found to be activated Factor V.

== Other species ==
All mammals have an extremely closely related blood coagulation process, using a combined cellular and serine protease process. It is possible for any mammalian coagulation factor to "cleave" its equivalent target in any other mammal. The only non-mammalian animal known to use serine proteases for blood coagulation is the horseshoe crab. Exemplifying the close links between coagulation and inflammation, the horseshoe crab has a primitive response to injury, carried out by cells known as amoebocytes (or hemocytes) which serve both hemostatic and immune functions.

== See also ==
- Agglutination (biology)
- Antihemorrhagic
- Post-vaccination embolic and thrombotic events
