= Platelet plug =

Aggregation of platelets formed during early stage of coagulation

The platelet plug, also known as the hemostatic plug or platelet thrombus, is an aggregation of platelets formed during early stages of hemostasis in response to one or more injuries to blood vessel walls. After platelets are recruited and begin to accumulate around the breakage, their “sticky” nature allows them to adhere to each other. This forms a platelet plug, which prevents more blood from leaving the body as well as any outside contaminants from getting in. The plug provides a temporary blockage of the break in the vasculature. As such, platelet plug formation occurs after vasoconstriction of the blood vessels but before the creation of the fibrin mesh clot, which is the more permanent solution to the injury. The result of the platelet plug formation is the coagulation of blood. It can also be referred to as primary hemostasis.

== History ==
For many years, the critical role that platelets (also known as thrombocytes) played in hemostasis and blood coagulation went unnoticed by scientists. Even though the existence of platelets as a cell fragment was initially discovered in 1882, it took scientists until the 1960s before they moved their interest from the interaction of platelets with blood coagulation to the interaction of platelets with themselves.

The discovery of adenosine diphosphate (ADP) as the primary inducer of platelet aggregation was a major breakthrough in the field of hematology. It was followed by the discovery of the platelet release reaction, as well as the aggregating properties of thrombin and collagen.

== Platelet plug formation ==
The platelet plug formation is the second step of hemostasis. It occurs after vasoconstriction. During the process, platelets begin to accumulate, or aggregate, on the damaged vessel wall.

Platelet plug formation occurs in three major steps:

=== Platelet activation ===
Under normal physiological conditions, blood flows through the body without any noticeable aggregation of platelets. This is because platelets are not initially programmed to accumulate by themselves because this could cause an undesirable thrombosis. However, during hemostasis, coagulation is desired. As such, the platelets in the plasma must be alerted to the need for a plug formation.

Any discontinuity detected in the vascular endothelium triggers an automatic response in the clotting system, which in turns stimulates thrombin production. Thrombin also causes platelet aggregation.

As such, more often than not, platelet adhesion and activation occur in overlapping steps, where one directly influences and contributes to the other.

=== Platelet adhesion ===
Once platelets are activated, when they come across injured endothelium cells, the von Willebrand factor (vWF) and fibrinogen will act as anchors to allow platelets to adhere onto the vessel wall. These molecules are released from the platelet themselves as a result of degranulation, a physiological change in the platelet's shape due to the secretion of the contents of the dense granules and alpha granules. From the dense granules, serotonin and adenosine diphosphate are released. From the alpha granules come molecules such as the platelet-derived growth factor, fibrinogen, and the von Willebrand factor (vWF), a glycoprotein critical in platelet activation and adhesion.

The ADP secreted from the dense granules then binds to receptors on the membrane of platelets. However, to allow for platelet adhesion to occur requires an additional molecule. Glycoprotein lb is a protein on the surface of the platelet membrane that binds to vWF. When vWF is bound to glycoprotein lb, it helps the platelet interact with other surfaces, like the inside of a damaged vessel wall. At high shear stress levels, the GP1b-von Willebrand Factor will initiate the platelet adhesion. This process will then be mediated by integrins, such as β1 (α2β1, α5β1) and β3 (αIIbβ3) integrins.

In addition, platelets are activated, they will also change shape in their cortical actin cytoskeleton. The platelets will transform from smooth, biconcave discs to fully spread cells. This dramatically increases their surface area and therefore allows for both increased blockage of the damaged cells as well as more space for adhesion to occur.

=== Platelet aggregation ===
After platelets make contact with the focal point of the vascular injury, they begin to interact with each other to form a platelet aggregate. Platelet aggregation is mainly mediated by β3 (αIIbβ3) integrin and its ligands, such as vWF and fibrinogen. While platelet membranes have binding sites for fibrinogen, they must be induced by thrombin. Thrombin triggers the binding of the adhesive platelets with vWF and fibrinogen. ADP can then catalyze the aggregation of platelets, allowing for fibrinogen to link two platelets together.

As more platelets accumulate, they release more chemicals, which in turn attract even more platelets. This is a positive feedback loop that eventually results in the formation of the platelet thrombus.

== Modifications to the platelet plug ==
=== Secondary hemostatic plug formation ===
A secondary hemostatic plug is formed after the temporary blockage is created. This process involves the conversion of fibrinogen, a soluble glycoprotein, into fibrin, an insoluble glycoprotein, using the enzyme thrombin. The fibrinogen forms fibrin to encase the platelet thrombus, thus creating a secondary hemostatic plug that is much more stable and securely attached to the vessel wall.

=== Consolidation of the hemostatic plug ===
Due to the shear force, a platelet thrombus attached to the blood vessel's walls can easily be swept away or disintegrated. As such, after the platelets have been anchored to the vessel wall, have been linked together, and have been enmeshed in fibrin, they must also be consolidated to ensure they can withstand such force. This is accomplished by factor XIII, also known as fibrin stabilizing factor, an enzyme that crosslinks fibrin. Factor XIII is critical in the consolidation of a hemostatic plug. Those who are found to be deficient in the enzyme exhibit delayed bleeding after surgical procedures.

== The contrary role of the platelet plug ==
While platelet activation and plug formation are necessary for the cessation of bleeding and vascular injuries, if platelet adhesion and aggregation occur in an unwarranted location, the result will instead be vascular obstruction and thrombosis. This is commonly observed in myocardial infarctions, in which platelet aggregation and adhesion result in a blocked coronary artery. As such, the same factors that cause platelets to coagulate during hemostasis can also contribute to unwanted thrombosis.

== Novel research ==
While the general mechanisms of hemostasis and platelet plug formation have already been discovered, there is still much to learn in terms of the chemicals contributing to the process. Only the key factors have been identified; there are still many molecules present during hemostasis that scientists do not understand the role they play.

=== Hemostasis in mice ===
Fibrinogen and vWF are known critical factors in hemostasis. However, it has been discovered that even in mice who lack both of these components, hemostasis and thrombosis still occur. This seems to suggest that there are other contributing molecules still undiscovered that may also play an important role in platelet aggregation and adhesion.
