= Tissue factor =

Protein involved in coagulation

F3
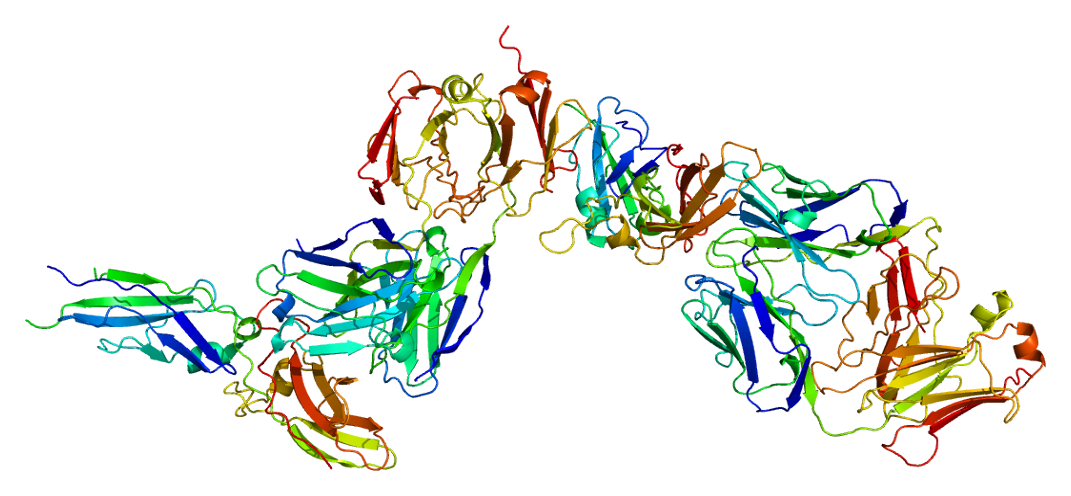

Identifiers
- Aliases: F3, CD142, TF, TFA, coagulation factor III, tissue factor
- External IDs: OMIM: 134390; MGI: 88381; GeneCards: F3
Available structures
PDB	Ortholog search: PDBe RCSB
PDB	List of PDB id codes 1AHW, 1BOY, 1DAN, 1FAK, 1J9C, 1JPS, 1O5D, 1TFH, 1UJ3, 1W0Y, 1W2K, 1WQV, 1WSS, 1WTG, 1WUN, 1WV7, 1Z6J, 2A2Q, 2AEI, 2AER, 2B7D, 2B8O, 2C4F, 2CEF, 2CEH, 2CEZ, 2CFJ, 2EC9, 2F9B, 2FIR, 2FLB, 2HFT, 2PUQ, 2ZP0, 2ZWL, 2ZZU, 3ELA, 3TH2, 3TH3, 3TH4, 4IBL, 4M7L, 4Z6A, 4ZMA, 4YLQ, 2FLR

Gene location (Human)
Chr.	Chromosome 1 (human)
Band	1p21.3	Start	94,529,173 bp
Band	1p21.3	End	94,541,759 bp

Gene location (Mouse)
Chr.	Chromosome 3 (mouse)
Band	3 G1|3 52.94 cM	Start	121,517,186 bp
Band	3 G1|3 52.94 cM	End	121,528,697 bp
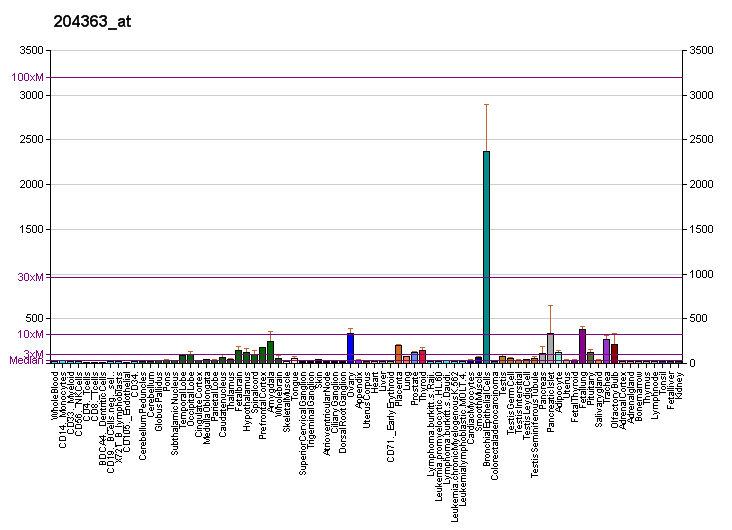
RNA expression pattern
Bgee	Human / Mouse (ortholog); Top expressed in: mucosa of paranasal sinus; palpebral conjunctiva; nasal epithelium; olfactory zone of nasal mucosa; amniotic fluid; stromal cell of endometrium; left uterine tube; lower lobe of lung; gallbladder; left ovary / Top expressed in: Eustachian tube; corneal stroma; skin of external ear; cervix; tunica adventitia of aorta; respiratory epithelium; olfactory epithelium; esophagus; conjunctival fornix; deep cerebellar nuclei; More reference expression data
BioGPS	More reference expression data
Gene ontology
Molecular function	protein binding; cytokine receptor activity; phospholipid binding; serine-type endopeptidase activity; protease binding
Cellular component	membrane; extracellular matrix; intrinsic component of external side of plasma membrane; plasma membrane; extracellular region; extracellular exosome; cell surface; extracellular space; serine-type peptidase complex; integral component of membrane; collagen-containing extracellular matrix
Biological process	hemostasis; positive regulation of protein kinase B signaling; positive regulation of endothelial cell proliferation; cytokine-mediated signaling pathway; positive regulation of cell migration; activation of blood coagulation via clotting cascade; positive regulation of platelet-derived growth factor receptor signaling pathway; positive regulation of angiogenesis; blood coagulation, extrinsic pathway; activation of plasma proteins involved in acute inflammatory response; activation of cysteine-type endopeptidase activity involved in apoptotic process; positive regulation of positive chemotaxis; blood coagulation; protein processing
Sources:Amigo / QuickGO
Orthologs
Databases	NCBI: entry; OMA: entry
Species	Human	Mouse
Entrez	2152	14066
Ensembl	ENSG00000117525	ENSMUSG00000028128
UniProt	P13726	P20352
RefSeq (mRNA)	NM_001993; NM_001178096	NM_010171
RefSeq (protein)	NP_001171567; NP_001984	NP_034301
Location (UCSC)	Chr 1: 94.53 – 94.54 Mb	Chr 3: 121.52 – 121.53 Mb
PubMed search
- Wikidata
View/Edit Human	View/Edit Mouse

Tissue factor, also called platelet tissue factor or Coagulation factor III, is a protein present in subendothelial tissue and leukocytes which plays a major role in coagulation and, in humans, is encoded by F3 gene. Its role in the blood clotting is the initiation of thrombin formation from the zymogen prothrombin. Thromboplastin defines the cascade that leads to the activation of factor X—the tissue factor pathway. In doing so, it has replaced the previously named extrinsic pathway in order to eliminate ambiguity.

== Function ==
The F3 gene encodes tissue factor also known as coagulation factor III, which is a cell surface glycoprotein. This factor enables cells to initiate the blood coagulation cascades, and it functions as the high-affinity receptor for the coagulation factor VII. The resulting complex provides a catalytic event that is responsible for initiation of the coagulation protease cascades by specific limited proteolysis. Unlike the other cofactors of these protease cascades, which circulate as nonfunctional precursors, this factor is a potent initiator that is fully functional when expressed on cell surfaces. There are three distinct domains of this factor: extracellular, transmembrane, and cytoplasmic. This protein is the only one in the coagulation pathway for which a congenital deficiency has not been described. In addition to the membrane-bound tissue factor, soluble form of tissue factor was also found which results from alternatively spliced tissue factor mRNA transcripts, in which exon 5 is absent and exon 4 is spliced directly to exon 6.

=== Coagulation ===
The coagulation cascade.

Tissue factor (TF) is the cell surface receptor for the serine protease factor VIIa.

The best known function of tissue factor is its role in blood coagulation. The complex of TF with factor VIIa catalyzes the conversion of the inactive protease factor X into the active protease factor Xa.

Together with factor VIIa, tissue factor forms the extrinsic pathway of coagulation. This is opposed to the intrinsic (amplification) pathway, which involves both activated factor IX and factor VIII. Both pathways lead to the activation of factor X (the common pathway), which combines with activated factor V in the presence of calcium and phospholipid to produce thrombin (thromboplastin activity).

=== Cytokine signaling ===
TF is related to a protein family known as the cytokine receptor class II family. The members of this receptor family are activated by cytokines. Cytokines are small proteins that can influence the behavior of white blood cells. Binding of VIIa to TF has also been found to start signaling processes inside the cell. The signaling function of TF/VIIa plays a role in angiogenesis and apoptosis. Pro-inflammatory and pro-angiogenic responses are activated by TF/VIIa-mediated cleavage by the protease-activated receptor 2 (PAR2). EphB2 and EphA2 of the Eph tyrosine kinase receptor (RTK) family can also be cleaved by TF/VIIa.

== Structure ==
Tissue factor belongs to the cytokine receptor protein superfamily and consists of three domains:

1. an extracellular domain, which consists of two fibronectin type III modules whose hydrophobic cores merge in the domain-domain interface. This serves as a (probably rigid) template for factor VIIa binding.
2. a transmembrane domain.
3. a cytosolic domain of 21 amino acids length inside the cell which is involved in the signaling function of TF.

Note that one of factor VIIa's domains, GLA domain, binds in the presence of calcium to negatively charged phospholipids, and this binding greatly enhances factor VIIa binding to tissue factor.

== Tissue distribution ==
Some cells release TF in response to blood vessel damage (see next paragraph) and some do only in response to inflammatory mediators (endothelial cells/macrophages).

TF is expressed by cells which are normally not exposed to flowing blood, such as sub-endothelial cells (e.g. smooth muscle cells) and cells surrounding blood vessels (e.g. fibroblasts). This can change when the blood vessel is damaged by, for example, physical injury or rupture of atherosclerotic plaques. Exposure of TF-expressing cells during injury allows the complex formation of TF with factor VII. Factor VII and TF form an equimolar complex in the presence of calcium ions, leading to the activation of factor VII on a membrane surface.

The inner surface of the blood vessel consists of endothelial cells. Endothelial cells do not express TF except when they are exposed to inflammatory molecules such as tumor necrosis factor-alpha (TNF-alpha). Another cell type that expresses TF on the cell surface in inflammatory conditions is the monocyte (a white blood cell).

== Thromboplastin ==
Historically, thromboplastin was a lab reagent, usually derived from placental sources, used to assay prothrombin times (PT time). Thromboplastin, by itself, could activate the extrinsic coagulation pathway. When manipulated in the laboratory, a derivative could be created called partial thromboplastin, which was used to measure the intrinsic pathway. This test is called the aPTT, or activated partial thromboplastin time. It was not until much later that the subcomponents of thromboplastin and partial thromboplastin were identified. Thromboplastin contains phospholipids as well as tissue factor, both of which are needed in the activation of the extrinsic pathway, whereas partial thromboplastin does not contain tissue factor. Tissue factor is not needed to activate the intrinsic pathway.

== Interactions ==
Tissue factor has been shown to interact with Factor VII.

== Additional images ==
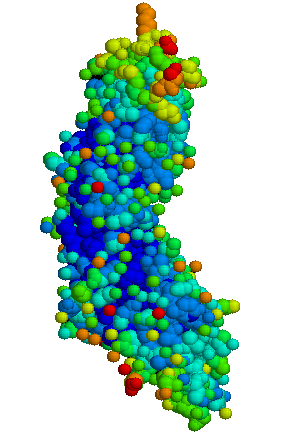
Tissue factor

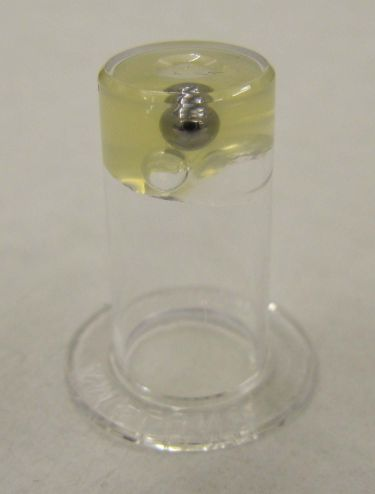
Blood plasma after the addition of tissue factor

== See also ==
- Hemostasis
