= Factor VII =

Mammalian protein found in humans

F7
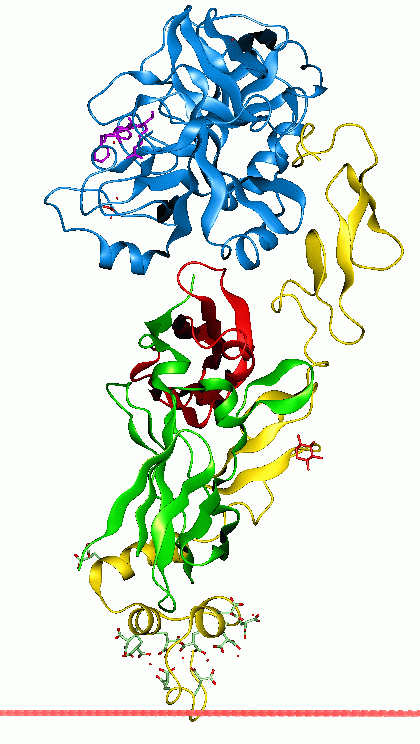

Identifiers
- Aliases: F7, SPCA, coagulation factor VII
- External IDs: OMIM: 613878; MGI: 109325; GeneCards: F7
Available structures
PDB	Ortholog search: PDBe RCSB
PDB	List of PDB id codes 4YT7, 1BF9, 1CVW, 1DAN, 1DVA, 1F7E, 1F7M, 1FAK, 1FF7, 1FFM, 1J9C, 1JBU, 1KLI, 1KLJ, 1O5D, 1QFK, 1W0Y, 1W2K, 1W7X, 1W8B, 1WQV, 1WSS, 1WTG, 1WUN, 1WV7, 1YGC, 1Z6J, 2A2Q, 2AEI, 2AER, 2B7D, 2B8O, 2BZ6, 2C4F, 2EC9, 2F9B, 2FIR, 2FLB, 2FLR, 2PUQ, 2ZP0, 2ZWL, 2ZZU, 3ELA, 3TH2, 3TH3, 3TH4, 4IBL, 4ISH, 4ISI, 4JYU, 4JYV, 4JZD, 4JZE, 4JZF, 4NA9, 4NG9, 4NGA, 4X8S, 4X8T, 4X8U, 4X8V, 4YT6, 4ZXX, 4ZXY, 4Z6A, 4ZMA, 4YLQ, 5I46
Enzyme activity
EC #	BRENDA	ExPASy	KEGG	MetaCyc
3.4.21.21	↗	↗	↗	↗

Gene location (Human)
Chr.	Chromosome 13 (human)
Band	13q34	Start	113,105,788 bp
Band	13q34	End	113,120,685 bp

Gene location (Mouse)
Chr.	Chromosome 8 (mouse)
Band	8 A1.1|8 5.73 cM	Start	13,076,034 bp
Band	8 A1.1|8 5.73 cM	End	13,085,809 bp
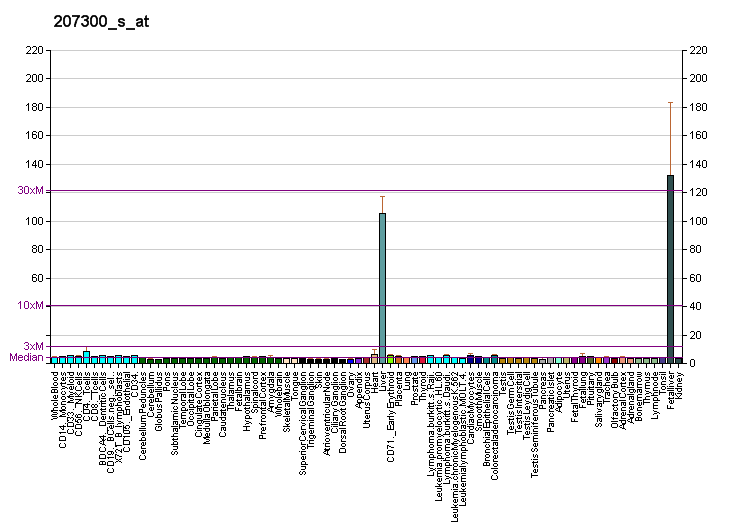
RNA expression pattern
Bgee	Human / Mouse (ortholog); Top expressed in: right lobe of liver; tendon of biceps brachii; testicle; ventral tegmental area; secondary oocyte; visceral pleura; pancreatic ductal cell; deltoid muscle; jejunum; retinal pigment epithelium / Top expressed in: left lobe of liver; right lung lobe; yolk sac; decidua; embryo; entorhinal cortex; stroma of bone marrow; carotid body; Ileal epithelium; choroid plexus of fourth ventricle; More reference expression data
BioGPS	More reference expression data
Gene ontology
Molecular function	calcium ion binding; endopeptidase activity; peptidase activity; protein binding; serine-type peptidase activity; hydrolase activity; serine-type endopeptidase activity; signaling receptor binding
Cellular component	vesicle; endoplasmic reticulum lumen; plasma membrane; extracellular region; Golgi lumen; extracellular space; serine-type peptidase complex; collagen-containing extracellular matrix
Biological process	hemostasis; positive regulation of protein kinase B signaling; response to organic cyclic compound; positive regulation of cell migration; positive regulation of platelet-derived growth factor receptor signaling pathway; proteolysis; response to estrogen; positive regulation of leukocyte chemotaxis; endoplasmic reticulum to Golgi vesicle-mediated transport; response to vitamin K; positive regulation of blood coagulation; response to nutrient levels; animal organ regeneration; response to growth hormone; response to hormone; blood coagulation, extrinsic pathway; positive regulation of positive chemotaxis; response to thyroid hormone; protein processing; blood coagulation; response to 2,3,7,8-tetrachlorodibenzodioxine; response to estradiol; response to carbon dioxide; response to genistein; response to cholesterol; circadian rhythm; response to thyroxine; response to Thyroid stimulating hormone; response to hypoxia; response to anticoagulant; response to astaxanthin; response to thyrotropin-releasing hormone
Sources:Amigo / QuickGO
Orthologs
Databases	NCBI: entry; OMA: entry
Species	Human	Mouse
Entrez	2155	14068
Ensembl	ENSG00000057593	ENSMUSG00000031443
UniProt	P08709	P70375
RefSeq (mRNA)	NM_000131; NM_001267554; NM_019616	NM_010172
RefSeq (protein)	NP_000122; NP_001254483; NP_062562	NP_034302
Location (UCSC)	Chr 13: 113.11 – 113.12 Mb	Chr 8: 13.08 – 13.09 Mb
PubMed search
- Wikidata
View/Edit Human	View/Edit Mouse

Coagulation factor VII (EC 3.4.21.21, formerly known as proconvertin) is a protein involved in coagulation and, in humans, is encoded by gene F7. It is an enzyme of the serine protease class. Once bound to tissue factor released from damaged tissues, it is converted to factor VIIa (or blood-coagulation factor VIIa, activated blood coagulation factor VII), which in turn activates factor IX and factor X.

Using genetic recombination a recombinant factor VIIa (eptacog alfa) (trade names include NovoSeven) has been approved by the FDA for the control of bleeding in hemophilia. It is sometimes used unlicensed in severe uncontrollable bleeding, although there have been safety concerns. A biosimilar form of recombinant activated factor VII (AryoSeven) is also available, but does not play any considerable role in the market.

In April 2020, the US FDA approved a new rFVIIa product, eptacog beta (SEVENFACT), the first bypassing agent (BPA) approved in more than 2 decades. As an rFVIIa product, eptacog beta works in a complex with tissue factor to activate factor X to Xa, thereby bypassing FVIII and FIX. The activation of Factor X to Xa initiates the coagulation cascade's common pathway, leading to clot formation at the site of hemorrhage. Activated FVII binds to endothelial protein C receptor (EPCR), which enhances hemostasis.14 One study showed that eptacog beta binds to EPCR with 25% to 30% more affinity than eptacog alfa, displacing protein C from EPCR binding sites and downregulating activated protein C generation, contributing to its hemostatic effect.

== Physiology ==
The main role of factor VII (FVII) is to initiate the process of coagulation in conjunction with tissue factor (TF/factor III). Tissue factor is found on the outside of blood vessels - normally not exposed to the bloodstream. Upon vessel injury, tissue factor is exposed to the blood and circulating factor VII. Once bound to TF, FVII is activated to FVIIa by different proteases, among which are thrombin (factor IIa), factor Xa, IXa, XIIa, and the FVIIa-TF complex itself. The complex of factor VIIa with TF catalyzes the conversion of factor IX and factor X into the active proteases, factor IXa and factor Xa, respectively.

The action of the factor is impeded by tissue factor pathway inhibitor (TFPI), which is released almost immediately after initiation of coagulation. Factor VII, which was discovered around 1950, is vitamin K-dependent and produced in the liver. Use of warfarin or similar anticoagulants decreases hepatic synthesis of FVII.

A coagulation enzyme cascade may begin with a few molecules of factor XII and culminate in the activation of millions of times more fibrin molecules.

== Structure ==
Factor VII shares a common domain architecture with factors IX and X.

== Genetics ==
The gene for factor VII is located on chromosome 13 (13q34).

== Role in disease ==
Factor VII deficiency (congenital proconvertin deficiency) is rare and inherited recessively. It presents as a hemophilia-like bleeding disorder. It is treated with recombinant factor VIIa (NovoSeven or AryoSeven). Gene therapy approaches for treating FVII deficiency are very promising.

== Medical uses ==
Recombinant factor VIIa, marketed under the trade names AryoSeven and NovoSeven, is used for people with hemophilia (with Factor VIII or IX deficiency) who have developed antibodies against replacement coagulation factor.

It has also been used in the setting of uncontrollable hemorrhage, but its role in this setting is controversial with insufficient evidence to support its use outside of clinical trials. The first report of its use in hemorrhage was in an Israeli soldier with uncontrollable bleeding in 1999. Risks of its use include an increase in arterial thrombosis. However, animal studies have not shown complications as seen in humans, in fact same of the studies show a better prognosis. In the military settings it is used as an off label intervention in complications related to disseminated intravascular coagulation related haemorrhage caused by penetrating trauma.

Recombinant human factor VII while initially looking promising in intracerebral hemorrhage failed to show benefit following further study and this is no longer recommended.

== Interactions ==
Factor VII has been shown to interact with tissue factor and endothelial protein C receptor.
