= Factor IX =

Protein involved in coagulation

F9
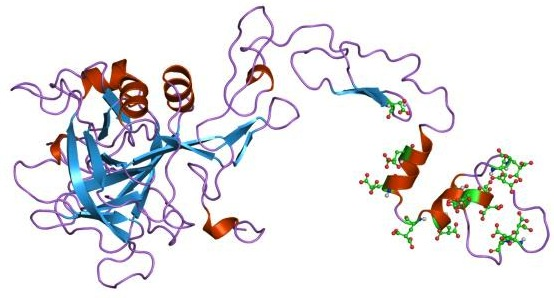

Identifiers
- Aliases: F9, F9 p22, FIX, HEMB, P19, PTC, THPH8, coagulation factor IX, Blood coagulation factor IX, Christmas Factor
- External IDs: OMIM: 300746; MGI: 88384; GeneCards: F9
Available structures
PDB	Ortholog search: PDBe RCSB
PDB	List of PDB id codes 1CFH, 1CFI, 1EDM, 1IXA, 1MGX, 1NL0, 1RFN, 2WPH, 2WPI, 2WPJ, 2WPK, 2WPL, 2WPM, 3KCG, 3LC3, 3LC5, 4YZU, 4Z0K, 4ZAE, 4WM0, 4WMA, 4WMI, 4WMK, 4WN2, 4WNH, 5EGM, 5JBC, 5JB9, 5JBB, 5JB8, 5JBA
Enzyme activity
EC #	BRENDA	ExPASy	KEGG	MetaCyc
3.4.21.22	↗	↗	↗	↗

Gene location (Human)
Chr.	X chromosome (human)
Band	Xq27.1	Start	139,530,739 bp
Band	Xq27.1	End	139,563,459 bp

Gene location (Mouse)
Chr.	X chromosome (mouse)
Band	X A6|X 33.5 cM	Start	59,044,824 bp
Band	X A6|X 33.5 cM	End	59,076,119 bp
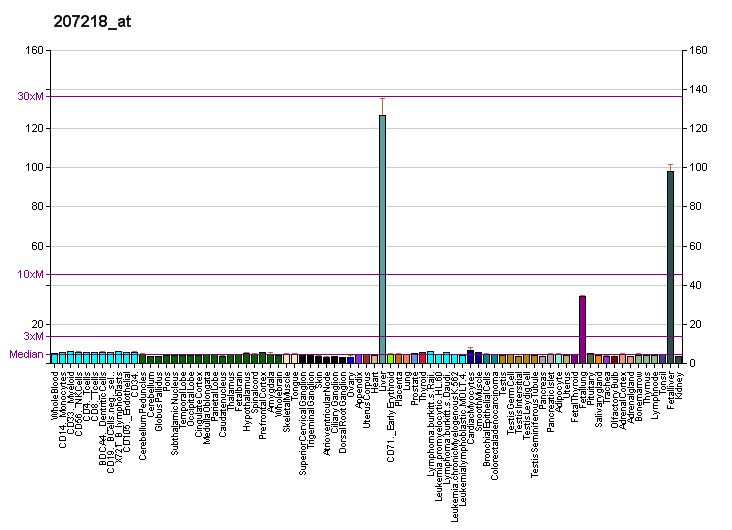
RNA expression pattern
Bgee	Human / Mouse (ortholog); Top expressed in: right lobe of liver; secondary oocyte; gonad; pancreatic ductal cell; skin of thigh; kidney; blood; human musculoskeletal system; muscular system; muscle / Top expressed in: left lobe of liver; lumbar spinal ganglion; gallbladder; sexually immature organism; thoracic diaphragm; medial head of gastrocnemius muscle; dentate gyrus; nucleus of stria terminalis; piriform cortex; jejunum; More reference expression data
BioGPS	More reference expression data
Gene ontology
Molecular function	endopeptidase activity; metal ion binding; peptidase activity; serine-type peptidase activity; hydrolase activity; calcium ion binding; serine-type endopeptidase activity; protein binding
Cellular component	endoplasmic reticulum lumen; plasma membrane; Golgi lumen; extracellular exosome; extracellular region; extracellular space; collagen-containing extracellular matrix
Biological process	hemostasis; blood coagulation, intrinsic pathway; zymogen activation; endoplasmic reticulum to Golgi vesicle-mediated transport; signal peptide processing; blood coagulation, extrinsic pathway; peptidyl-glutamic acid carboxylation; proteolysis; blood coagulation
Sources:Amigo / QuickGO
Orthologs
Databases	NCBI: entry; OMA: entry
Species	Human	Mouse
Entrez	2158	14071
Ensembl	ENSG00000101981	ENSMUSG00000031138
UniProt	P00740	P16294
RefSeq (mRNA)	NM_000133; NM_001313913	NM_007979; NM_001305797
RefSeq (protein)	NP_000124; NP_001300842	NP_001292726; NP_032005
Location (UCSC)	Chr X: 139.53 – 139.56 Mb	Chr X: 59.04 – 59.08 Mb
PubMed search
- Wikidata
View/Edit Human	View/Edit Mouse

Factor IX (EC 3.4.21.22) is one of the serine proteases involved in coagulation; it belongs to peptidase family S1. Deficiency of this protein causes haemophilia B.

It was discovered in 1952 after a young boy named Stephen Christmas was found to be lacking this exact factor, leading to haemophilia. Coagulation factor IX is on the World Health Organization's List of Essential Medicines.

== Physiology ==
The blood coagulation and Protein C pathway.

Factor IX is produced as a zymogen, an inactive precursor. It is processed to remove the signal peptide, glycosylated and then cleaved by factor XIa (of the contact pathway) or factor VIIa (of the tissue factor pathway) to produce a two-chain form, where the chains are linked by a disulfide bridge. When activated into factor IXa, in the presence of Ca^{2+}, membrane phospholipids, and a Factor VIII cofactor, it hydrolyses one arginine-isoleucine bond in factor X to form factor Xa.

Factor IX is inhibited by antithrombin.

Factor IX expression increases with age in humans and mice. In mouse models, mutations within the promoter region of factor IX have an age-dependent phenotype.

== Domain architecture ==
Factors VII, IX, and X all play key roles in blood coagulation and also share a common domain architecture. The factor IX protein is composed of four protein domains: the Gla domain, two tandem copies of the EGF domain and a C-terminal trypsin-like peptidase domain which carries out the catalytic cleavage.

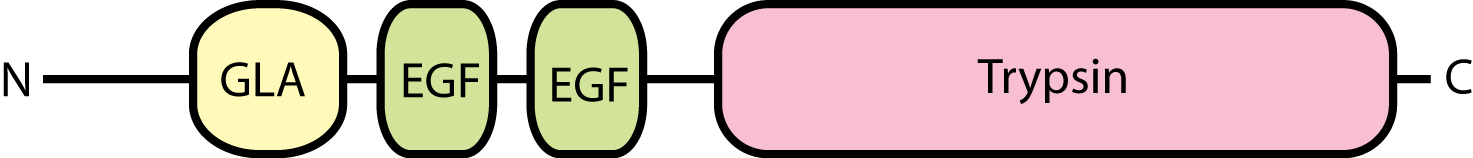
Human factor IX protein domain architecture, where each protein domain is represented by a coloured box

The N-terminal EGF domain has been shown to at least in part be responsible for binding tissue factor. Wilkinson et al. conclude that residues 88 to 109 of the second EGF domain mediate binding to platelets and assembly of the factor X activating complex.

The structures of all four domains have been solved. A structure of the two EGF domains and the trypsin-like domain was determined for the pig protein. The structure of the Gla domain, which is responsible for Ca(II)-dependent phospholipid binding, was also determined by NMR.

Several structures of 'super active' mutants have been solved, which reveal the nature of factor IX activation by other proteins in the clotting cascade.

== Genetics ==
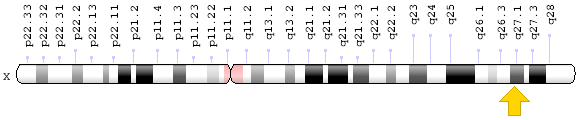
In human, the F9 gene is located on the X chromosome at position q27.1.

Because the gene for factor IX is located on the X chromosome (Xq27.1-q27.2), loss-of-function mutations thereof are X-linked recessive: males experience the disease phenotype much more frequently than females. At least 534 disease-causing mutations in this gene have been discovered. The F9 gene was first cloned in 1982 by Kotoku Kurachi and Earl Davie.

Polly, a transgenic cloned Poll Dorset sheep carrying the gene for factor IX, was produced by Dr Ian Wilmut at the Roslin Institute in 1997.

== Role in disease ==
Factor IX INN: nonacog alfa
Clinical data
- Trade names: Benefix
- License data: US DailyMed: Coagulation Factor IX
- ATC code: None

Legal status
- Legal status: AU: S4 (Prescription only)

Factor IX INN: nonacog gamma
Clinical data
- Trade names: Rixubis
- Routes of administration: Intravenous
- ATC code: None

Legal status
- Legal status: EU: Rx-only

Factor IX INN: albutrepenonacog alfa
Clinical data
- Trade names: Idelvion
- License data: US DailyMed: Coagulation Factor IX
- ATC code: None

Legal status
- Legal status: AU: S4 (Prescription only); CA: ℞-only

Factor IX INN: eftrenonacog alfa
Clinical data
- Trade names: Alprolix
- License data: US DailyMed: Coagulation Factor IX
- ATC code: None

Legal status
- Legal status: AU: S4 (Prescription only); EU: Rx-only

Factor IX INN: nonacog beta pegol
Clinical data
- Trade names: Refixia
- ATC code: None

Legal status
- Legal status: AU: S4 (Prescription only)

Deficiency of factor IX causes the blood clotting disorder haemophilia B. Named after Stephen Christmas (the first documented patient), it is also known as Christmas disease. Recombinant

- nonacog alfa (brand name Benefix)
- nonacog gamma (brand name Rixubis)
- albutrepenonacog alfa (brand name Idelvion)
- eftrenonacog alfa (brand name Alprolix)
- nonacog beta pegol (brand name Refixia)
- coagulation factor IX [recombinant] (Benefix)
- coagulation factor IX [recombinant] (Idelvion)
- coagulation factor IX (recombinant), Fc fusion protein (Alprolix)
- coagulation factor IX [recombinant] (Ixinity)
- coagulation factor IX [recombinant] (Rebinyn)
- coagulation factor IX [recombinant] (Rixubis)
- coagulation factor IX (human) (Alphanine SD)

Some rare mutations of factor IX result in elevated clotting activity, and can result in clotting diseases, such as deep vein thrombosis. This gain of function mutation renders the protein hyperfunctional and is associated with familial early-onset thrombophilia.

Factor IX deficiency is treated by injection of purified factor IX produced through cloning in various animal or animal cell vectors. Tranexamic acid may be of value in patients undergoing surgery who have inherited factor IX deficiency in order to reduce the perioperative risk of bleeding.

A list of all the mutations in Factor IX is compiled and maintained by EAHAD.

Coagulation factor IX is on the World Health Organization's List of Essential Medicines.
