= Factor X =

Mammalian protein found in Homo sapiens

F10
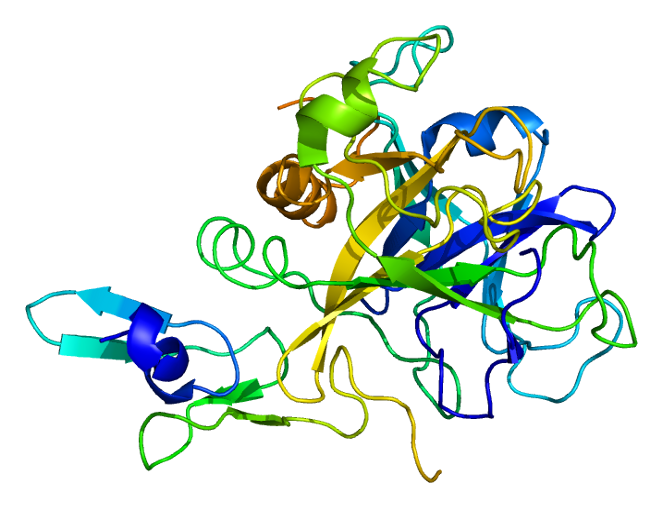

Identifiers
- Aliases: F10, FX, FXA, coagulation factor X
- External IDs: OMIM: 613872; MGI: 103107; GeneCards: F10
Available structures
PDB	Ortholog search: PDBe RCSB
PDB	List of PDB id codes 1C5M, 1EZQ, 1F0R, 1F0S, 1FAX, 1FJS, 1G2L, 1G2M, 1HCG, 1IOE, 1IQE, 1IQF, 1IQG, 1IQH, 1IQI, 1IQJ, 1IQK, 1IQL, 1IQM, 1IQN, 1KSN, 1LPG, 1LPK, 1LPZ, 1LQD, 1MQ5, 1MQ6, 1NFU, 1NFW, 1NFX, 1NFY, 1P0S, 1V3X, 1WU1, 1XKA, 1XKB, 1Z6E, 2BMG, 2BOH, 2BOK, 2BQ6, 2BQ7, 2BQW, 2CJI, 2D1J, 2EI6, 2EI7, 2EI8, 2FZZ, 2G00, 2GD4, 2H9E, 2J2U, 2J34, 2J38, 2J4I, 2J94, 2J95, 2JKH, 2P16, 2P3F, 2P3T, 2P3U, 2P93, 2P94, 2P95, 2PHB, 2PR3, 2Q1J, 2RA0, 2UWL, 2UWO, 2UWP, 2VH0, 2VH6, 2VVC, 2VVU, 2VVV, 2VWL, 2VWM, 2VWN, 2VWO, 2W26, 2W3I, 2W3K, 2WYG, 2WYJ, 2XBV, 2XBW, 2XBX, 2XBY, 2XC0, 2XC4, 2XC5, 2Y5F, 2Y5G, 2Y5H, 2Y7X, 2Y7Z, 2Y80, 2Y81, 2Y82, 3CEN, 3CS7, 3ENS, 3FFG, 3HPT, 3IIT, 3K9X, 3KL6, 3Q3K, 3SW2, 3TK5, 3TK6, 4A7I, 3KQB, 3KQC, 3KQD, 3KQE, 3LIW, 3M36, 3M37, 4BTI, 4BTT, 4BTU, 4Y6D, 4Y71, 4Y76, 4Y79, 4Y7A, 4Y7B, 4ZHA, 4ZH8, 5K0H
Enzyme activity
EC #	BRENDA	ExPASy	KEGG	MetaCyc
3.4.21.6	↗	↗	↗	↗

Gene location (Human)
Chr.	Chromosome 13 (human)
Band	13q34	Start	113,122,799 bp
Band	13q34	End	113,149,529 bp

Gene location (Mouse)
Chr.	Chromosome 8 (mouse)
Band	8 A1.1|8 5.73 cM	Start	13,087,308 bp
Band	8 A1.1|8 5.73 cM	End	13,106,676 bp
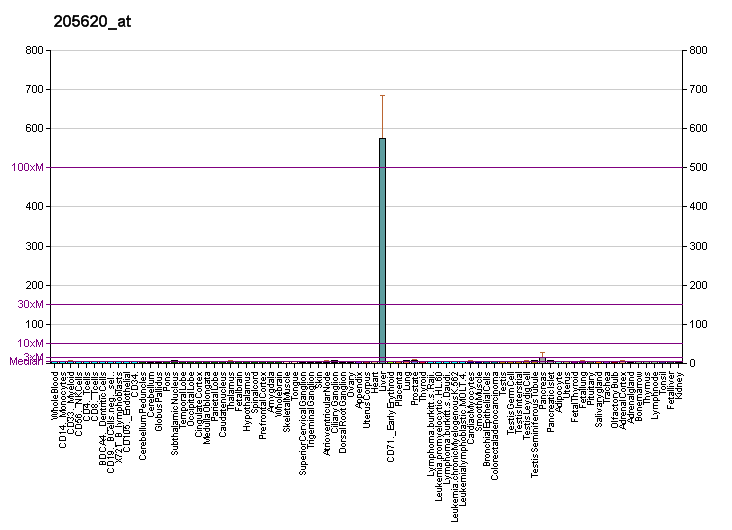
RNA expression pattern
Bgee	Human / Mouse (ortholog); Top expressed in: right lobe of liver; stromal cell of endometrium; right auricle of heart; canal of the cervix; ectocervix; gastric mucosa; right ovary; left ovary; right coronary artery; left uterine tube / Top expressed in: left lobe of liver; yolk sac; gallbladder; embryo; fetal liver hematopoietic progenitor cell; epithelium of small intestine; blood; sexually immature organism; granulocyte; bone marrow; More reference expression data
BioGPS	More reference expression data
Gene ontology
Molecular function	calcium ion binding; peptidase activity; protein binding; serine-type peptidase activity; serine-type endopeptidase activity; phospholipid binding; hydrolase activity
Cellular component	endoplasmic reticulum lumen; intrinsic component of external side of plasma membrane; plasma membrane; extracellular region; Golgi lumen; extracellular space
Biological process	hemostasis; positive regulation of protein kinase B signaling; positive regulation of cell migration; blood coagulation; proteolysis; endoplasmic reticulum to Golgi vesicle-mediated transport; blood coagulation, extrinsic pathway
Sources:Amigo / QuickGO
Orthologs
Databases	NCBI: entry; OMA: entry
Species	Human	Mouse
Entrez	2159	14058
Ensembl	ENSG00000126218	ENSMUSG00000031444
UniProt	P00742	O88947
RefSeq (mRNA)	NM_000504; NM_001312674; NM_001312675	NM_001242368; NM_007972
RefSeq (protein)	NP_000495; NP_001299603; NP_001299604	NP_001229297; NP_031998
Location (UCSC)	Chr 13: 113.12 – 113.15 Mb	Chr 8: 13.09 – 13.11 Mb
PubMed search
- Wikidata
View/Edit Human	View/Edit Mouse

Coagulation factor X (EC 3.4.21.6), or Stuart factor, is an enzyme of the coagulation cascade, encoded in humans by F10 gene. It is a serine endopeptidase (protease group S1, PA clan). Factor X is synthesized in the liver and requires vitamin K for its synthesis.

Factor X is activated, by hydrolysis, into factor Xa by both factor IX with its cofactor, factor VIII in a complex known as intrinsic pathway; and factor VII with its cofactor, tissue factor in a complex known as extrinsic pathway. It is therefore the first member of the final common pathway or thrombin pathway.

It acts by cleaving prothrombin in two places (an Arg-Thr and then an Arg-Ile bond), which yields the active thrombin. This process is optimized when factor Xa is complexed with activated co-factor V in the prothrombinase complex.

Factor Xa is inactivated by protein Z-dependent protease inhibitor (ZPI), a serine protease inhibitor (serpin). The affinity of this protein for factor Xa is increased 1000-fold by the presence of protein Z, while it does not require protein Z for inactivation of factor XI. Defects in protein Z lead to increased factor Xa activity and a propensity for thrombosis. The half life of factor X is 40–45 hours.

== Structure ==
The first crystal structure of human factor Xa was deposited in May 1993. To date, 191 crystal structures of factor Xa with various inhibitors have been deposited in the protein data bank. The active site of factor Xa is divided into four subpockets as S1, S2, S3 and S4. The S1 subpocket determines the major component of selectivity and binding. The S2 sub-pocket is small, shallow and not well defined. It merges with the S4 subpocket. The S3 sub-pocket is located on the rim of the S1 pocket and is quite exposed to solvent. The S4 sub-pocket has three ligand binding domains: the "hydrophobic box", the "cationic hole" and the water site. Factor Xa inhibitors generally bind in an L-shaped conformation, where one group of the ligand occupies the anionic S1 pocket lined by residues Asp189, Ser195, and Tyr228, and another group of the ligand occupies the aromatic S4 pocket lined by residues Tyr99, Phe174, and Trp215. Typically, a fairly rigid linker group bridges these two interaction sites.

== Genetics ==
The human factor X gene is located on chromosome 13 (13q34).

== Role in disease ==
Inborn deficiency of factor X is very rare (1:1,000,000), and may present with epistaxis (nosebleeds), hemarthrosis (bleeding into joints) and gastrointestinal blood loss. Apart from congenital deficiency, low factor X levels may occur occasionally in a number of disease states. For example, factor X deficiency may be seen in amyloidosis, where factor X is adsorbed to the amyloid fibrils in the vasculature.

Deficiency of vitamin K or antagonism by warfarin (or similar medication) leads to the production of an inactive factor X. In warfarin therapy, this is desirable to prevent thrombosis. As of late 2007, four out of five emerging anti-coagulation therapeutics targeted this enzyme.

Inhibiting Factor Xa would offer an alternate method for anticoagulation. Direct Xa inhibitors are popular anticoagulants.

Polymorphisms in Factor X have been associated with an increased prevalence in bacterial infections, suggesting a possible role directly regulating the immune response to bacterial pathogens.

== Therapeutic use ==
Factor X is part of fresh frozen plasma and the prothrombinase complex. There are two commercially available Factor X concentrates: "Factor X P Behring" manufactured by CSL Behring, and high purity Factor X Coagadex produced by Bio Products Laboratory and approved for use in the United States by the FDA in October 2015, and in the EU in March 2016, after earlier acceptance by CHMP and COMP.

Kcentra, manufactured by CSL Behring, is a concentrate containing coagulation Factors II, VII, IX and X, and antithrombotic Proteins C and S.

== Use in biochemistry ==
The factor Xa protease can be used in biochemistry to cleave off protein tags that improve expression or purification of a protein of interest. Its preferred cleavage site (after the arginine in the sequence Ile-Glu/Asp-Gly-Arg, IEGR or IDGR) can easily be engineered between a tag sequence and the protein of interest. After expression and purification, the tag is then proteolytically removed by factor Xa.

== Factor Xa ==
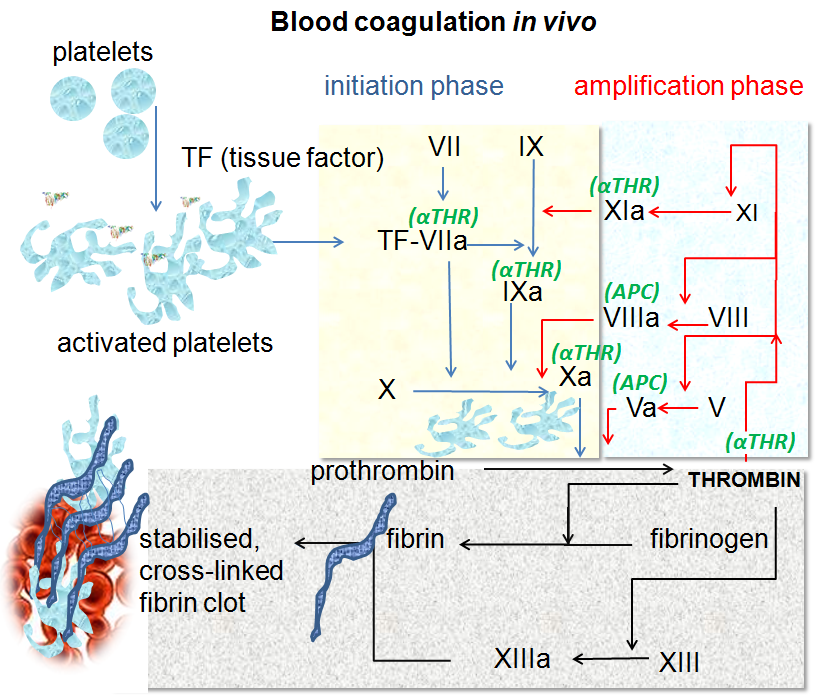
Blood coagulation pathways in vivo showing the central role played by thrombin

Factor Xa is the activated form of the coagulation factor X, also known as thrombokinase. Factor X is an enzyme, a serine endopeptidase, which plays a key role at several stages of the coagulation system. Factor X is synthesized in the liver. The most commonly used anticoagulants in clinical practice, warfarin and the heparin series of anticoagulants and fondaparinux, act to inhibit the action of Factor Xa in various degrees.

Traditional models of coagulation developed in the 1960s envisaged two separate cascades, the extrinsic (tissue factor (TF)) pathway and the intrinsic pathway. These pathways converge to a common point, the formation of the Factor Xa/Va complex which together with calcium and bound on a phospholipids surface, generate thrombin (Factor IIa) from prothrombin (Factor II).

A new model, the cell-based model of anticoagulation appears to explain more fully the steps in coagulation. This model has three stages: 1) initiation of coagulation on TF-bearing cells, 2) amplification of the procoagulant signal by thrombin generated on the TF-bearing cell and 3) propagation of thrombin generation on the platelet surface. Factor Xa plays a key role in all three of these stages.

In stage 1, Factor VII binds to the transmembrane protein TF on the surface of cells and is converted to Factor VIIa. The result is a Factor VIIa/TF complex, which catalyzes the activation of Factor X and Factor IX. Factor Xa formed on the surface of the TF-bearing cell interacts with Factor Va to form the prothrombinase complex which generates small amounts of thrombin on the surface of TF-bearing cells.

In stage 2, the amplification stage, if enough thrombin has been generated, then activation of platelets and platelet-associated cofactors occurs.

In stage 3, thrombin generation, Factor XIa activates free Factor IX on the surface of activated platelets. The activated Factor IXa with Factor VIIIa forms the "tenase" complex. This "tenase" complex activates more Factor X, which in turn forms new prothrombinase complexes with Factor Va. Factor Xa is the prime component of the prothrombinase complex which converts large amounts of prothrombin—the "thrombin burst". Each molecule of Factor Xa can generate 1000 molecules of thrombin. This large burst of thrombin is responsible for fibrin polymerization to form a thrombus.

Factor Xa also plays a role in other biological processes that are not directly related to coagulation, like wound healing, tissue remodelling, inflammation, angiogenesis and atherosclerosis.

Inhibition of the synthesis or activity of Factor X is the mechanism of action for many anticoagulants in use today. Warfarin, a synthetic derivative of coumarin, is the most widely used oral anticoagulant in the US. In some European countries, other coumarin derivatives (phenprocoumon and acenocoumarol) are used. These agents known as vitamin K antagonists (VKA), inhibit the vitamin K-dependent carboxylation of Factors II (prothrombin), VII, IX, X in the hepatocyte. This carboxylation after the translation is essential for the physiological activity.

Heparin (unfractionated heparin) and its derivatives low molecular weight heparin (LMWH) bind to a plasma cofactor, antithrombin (AT) to inactivate several coagulation factors IIa, Xa, XIa and XIIa. The affinity of unfractionated heparin and the various LMWHs for Factor Xa varies considerably. The efficacy of heparin-based anticoagulants increases as selectivity for Factor Xa increases. LMWH shows increased inactivation of Factor Xa compared to unfractionated heparin, and fondaparinux, an agent based on the critical pentasaccharide sequence of heparin, shows more selectivity than LMWH. This inactivation of Factor Xa by heparins is termed "indirect" since it relies on the presence of AT and not a direct interaction with Factor Xa.

Recently a new series of specific, direct acting inhibitors of factor Xa has been developed. These include the drugs rivaroxaban, apixaban, betrixaban, LY517717, darexaban (YM150), edoxaban and 813893. These agents have several theoretical advantages over current therapy. They may be given orally. They have rapid onset of action. And they may be more effective against Factor Xa in that they inhibit both free Factor Xa and Factor Xa in the prothrombinase complex.

== History ==
American and British scientists described deficiency of factor X independently in 1953 and 1956, respectively. As with some other coagulation factors, the factor was initially named after these patients, a Mr Rufus Stuart (1921) and a Miss Audrey Prower (1934). At that time, those investigators could not know that the human genetic defect they had identified would be found in the previously characterized enzyme called thrombokinase.

Thrombokinase was the name coined by Paul Morawitz in 1904 to describe the substance that converted prothrombin to thrombin and caused blood to clot. That name embodied an important new concept in understanding blood coagulation – that an enzyme was critically important in the activation of prothrombin. Morawitz believed that his enzyme came from cells such as platelets yet, in keeping with the state of knowledge about enzymes at that time, he had no clear idea about the chemical nature of his thrombokinase or its mechanism of action. Those uncertainties led to decades during which the terms thrombokinase and thromboplastin were both used to describe the activator of prothrombin and led to controversy about its chemical nature and origin.

In 1947, J Haskell Milstone isolated a proenzyme from bovine plasma which, when activated, converted prothrombin to thrombin. Following Morawitz's designation, he called it prothrombokinase and by 1951 had purified the active enzyme, thrombokinase. Over the next several years he showed that thrombokinase was a proteolytic enzyme that, by itself, could activate prothrombin. Its activity was greatly enhanced by addition of calcium, other serum factors, and tissue extracts, which represented the thromboplastins that promoted the conversion of prothrombin to thrombin by their interaction with thrombokinase. In 1964 Milstone summarized his work and that of others: “There are many chemical reactions which are so slow that they would not be of physiological use if they were not accelerated by enzymes. We are now confronted with a reaction, catalyzed by an enzyme, which is still too slow unless aided by accessory factors.”

== Interactions ==
Factor X has been shown to interact with Tissue factor pathway inhibitor.
