= Platelet membrane glycoprotein =

Surface glycoproteins involved in hemostasis

Platelet membrane glycoproteins are surface glycoproteins found on platelets (thrombocytes) which play a key role in hemostasis. When the blood vessel wall is damaged, platelet membrane glycoproteins interact with the extracellular matrix.

== Receptors involved in platelet adhesion to collagen ==
Membrane glycoproteins GPIa/IIa, GPVI and probably GPIV as well, function as collagen receptors, engaged in platelet adhesion to collagen. The leading role in the elimination of high-stress injury is taken by the glycoprotein Ib-IX-V complex.

== Interactions of the platelet surface glycoproteins ==
The binding of von Willebrand factor (vWF) results in conformational changes within the GPIb-V-IX complex. In consequence, this complex activates GPIIb / IIIa membrane glycoproteins, allowing them to bind fibrinogen. Fibrinogen molecules then interconnect the platelets, serving as the basis for platelet aggregation. In the absence of fibrinogen, the platelets are joined by vWF due to its ability to bind the activated GPIIb / IIIa complex.

== Membrane glycoproteins ==
=== Glycoprotein Ib-IX-V complex (GPIb-IX-V) ===
This transmembrane glycoprotein complex is composed of four subunits: GPIbα, GPIbβ, GPV and GPIX. Each of them has a variable number of leucine-rich repeats. GPIbα and GPIbβ are linked by disulfide bridges, while the GPV and GPIX associate non-covalently with the complex. The GPIbα subunit bears the binding site for von Willebrand factor (vWF), α-thrombin, leukocyte integrin αMβ2 and P-selectin. The binding between GPIbα and vWF mediates the capture of platelets to the injured vascular wall. The deficiency in glycoprotein Ib-IX-V complex synthesis leads to Bernard–Soulier syndrome.

=== Glycoprotein VI (GPVI) ===
Glycoprotein VI is one of the immunoglobulin superfamily type I transmembrane glycoproteins. It is an important collagen receptor involved in collagen-induced platelet activation and adhesion. It plays a key role in their procoagulant activity and subsequent thrombin and fibrin formation. Its procoagulant function may contribute to arterial or venous thrombosis. The FCR pathway of GPVI activation involves γ chain (GPVI transmembrane domain associates with γ chain FCR), Src kinase FYN / LYN, and LAT adaptor protein, all participating in phospholipase C activation.

=== Glycoprotein Ia / IIa complex (GPIa / IIa = integrin α_{2}β_{1}) ===
This is a receptor for collagen type I and IV. It consists of two subunits (α_{2} and β_{1}). The α_{2} subunit includes a domain homologous to von Willebrand factor domain binding to collagen. The β_{1} subunit has four cysteine-rich regions and a structure similar to other β-integrins. The interaction with collagen leads to stabilization of the platelets. The surface expression of this complex shows high variability, particularly in relation to the polymorphism of GPIa subunit gene. Different opinions exist on the importance of C - T point mutation at position 807, which is believed to be associated with the risk of myocardial infarction or ischemic stroke.

=== Glycoprotein IIb / IIIa complex (GPIIb / IIIa = integrin α_{IIb}β_{3}) ===
This complex interacts with fibrinogen and thus plays an important role in platelet aggregation and adhesion to endothelial surfaces. Activation of this complex initiates the platelet aggregation and the formation of primary platelet plug, a fibrin clot. The IIb / IIIa complex is a major platelet membrane component. There are as many as 50 000 copies. The α_{IIb} (GPIIb) is composed of two subunits linked by disulfide bridges. The β_{3} (GPIIIa) forms a single polypeptide chain. These subunits form Ca^{2+} - dependent complex on the surface of platelet membrane in a 1:1 ratio.

Fibrinogen sites recognized by glycoprotein IIb / IIIa complex:

- dodecapeptide located in the C-terminal of the fibrinogen γ chain (the most important)
- RGD sequence of the α chain → the Arginine-Glycine-Aspartate amino acid sequence

This complex also binds vWF, fibronectin and vitronectin. In the resting state the contact between the two protein subunits (necessary for the complex activation) is prevented by aggregin, which disables their contact necessary for the complex activation. The complex can be activated by ADP. When bound to ADP, conformational changes occur within the aggregin molecule and consequently, it dissociates from the two subunits. Furthermore, the complex can be activated by thrombin. Thrombin binding to its receptor activates protein kinase C and increases the level of inositol triphosphate. Consequently, there is a release of calcium ions that activate calpain. Calpain cleaves aggregin, and thus allows for joining of the two subunits. Deficiency in the IIb / IIIa complex is described as Glanzmann's thrombasthenia. Patients completely lack the ability to aggregate platelets.

=== GPV / IIIa (GPV / IIa = integrin α_{5}β_{1}) ===
This is a heterodimer. Its α_{5} subunit is 36% identical to the GPIIb subunit. This complex is located mainly on endothelial cells but also on smooth muscle cells, macrophages and platelets. Its main function is in the adhesion of cells to the extracellular matrix components.
