= COAT platelet defect =

Medical condition

- Other names: Collagen and thrombin-activated platelet defect.

A collagen- and thrombin-activated (COAT) platelet defect is a platelet function disorder that is due to a reduced ability to generate procoagulant platelets. It is associated with a clinically relevant bleeding phenotype.

During physiological platelet activation, a fraction of platelets expresses phosphatidylserine on their surface and become highly efficient in sustaining thrombin generation. These so-called COAT platelets, can be generated by dual-agonist stimulation with collagen and thrombin in a laboratory setting. COAT platelet defects should be distinguished from Scott syndrome, a rare bleeding disorder in which patients have impaired phospholipid scrambling and do not express negatively charged phospholipids on their surface even after treatment with calcium ionophores.

== Mechanism ==
Procoagulant platelets are a functional subgroup of platelets with distinct properties in physiological hemostasis. Following strong activation, procoagulant platelets express phosphatidylserine on their surface and become highly efficient in sustaining thrombin generation and parallelly gain pro-haemostatic function by retaining α-granule proteins on their membranes. While a low level of procoagulant platelets is associated with impaired platelet function and bleeding diathesis high levels have been shown to worsen thrombotic events.
