= ANO6 =

Protein-coding gene in humans

Identifiers
- Aliases: ANO6, BDPLT7, SCTS, TMEM16F, anoctamin 6
- External IDs: OMIM: 608663; MGI: 2145890; GeneCards: ANO6

Gene location (Human)
Chr.	Chromosome 12 (human)
Band	12q12	Start	45,215,987 bp
Band	12q12	End	45,482,280 bp

Gene location (Mouse)
Chr.	Chromosome 15 (mouse)
Band	15|15 E3- F1	Start	95,688,724 bp
Band	15|15 E3- F1	End	95,872,632 bp
RNA expression pattern
Bgee	Human / Mouse (ortholog); Top expressed in: pancreatic epithelial cell; secondary oocyte; tibialis anterior muscle; deltoid muscle; jejunal mucosa; mucosa of ileum; quadriceps femoris muscle; Skeletal muscle tissue of rectus abdominis; vastus lateralis muscle; Skeletal muscle tissue of biceps brachii / Top expressed in: otolith organ; utricle; vestibular membrane of cochlear duct; fossa; ascending aorta; ciliary body; internal carotid artery; stroma of bone marrow; condyle; external carotid artery; More reference expression data
BioGPS	n/a
Gene ontology
Molecular function	phospholipid scramblase activity; protein homodimerization activity; protein dimerization activity; chloride channel activity; voltage-gated chloride channel activity; voltage-gated ion channel activity; protein binding; calcium activated cation channel activity; intracellular calcium activated chloride channel activity
Cellular component	extracellular exosome; integral component of membrane; membrane; cell surface; chloride channel complex; intracellular anatomical structure; plasma membrane; cytosol; specific granule membrane; tertiary granule membrane
Biological process	blood coagulation; calcium activated phosphatidylcholine scrambling; sodium ion transmembrane transport; phosphatidylserine exposure on blood platelet; dendritic cell chemotaxis; calcium activated galactosylceramide scrambling; activation of blood coagulation via clotting cascade; positive regulation of endothelial cell apoptotic process; lipid transport; positive regulation of phagocytosis, engulfment; pore complex assembly; bone mineralization involved in bone maturation; positive regulation of apoptotic process; regulation of ion transmembrane transport; ion transport; cation transport; ion transmembrane transport; calcium activated phosphatidylserine scrambling; calcium activated phospholipid scrambling; plasma membrane phospholipid scrambling; positive regulation of bone mineralization; bleb assembly; negative regulation of cell volume; positive regulation of monocyte chemotaxis; chloride transmembrane transport; calcium ion transmembrane transport; chloride transport; positive regulation of ion transmembrane transport; purinergic nucleotide receptor signaling pathway; regulation of anion transmembrane transport; neutrophil degranulation; transport; positive regulation of potassium ion export across plasma membrane
Sources:Amigo / QuickGO
Orthologs
Databases	NCBI: entry; OMA: entry
Species	Human	Mouse
Entrez	196527	105722
Ensembl	ENSG00000177119	ENSMUSG00000064210
UniProt	Q4KMQ2	Q6P9J9
RefSeq (mRNA)	NM_001025356; NM_001142678; NM_001142679; NM_001142680; NM_001204803	NM_001253813; NM_175344
RefSeq (protein)	NP_001020527; NP_001136150; NP_001136151; NP_001191732	NP_001240742; NP_780553
Location (UCSC)	Chr 12: 45.22 – 45.48 Mb	Chr 15: 95.69 – 95.87 Mb
PubMed search
- Wikidata
View/Edit Human	View/Edit Mouse

Anoctamin 6 is a protein that in humans is encoded by the ANO6 gene.

== Function ==
This gene encodes a multi-pass transmembrane protein that belongs to the anoctamin family. This protein is an essential component for the calcium-dependent exposure of phosphatidylserine on the cell surface. The scrambling of phospholipid occurs in various biological systems, such as when blood platelets are activated, they expose phosphatidylserine to trigger the clotting system. Mutations in this gene are associated with Scott syndrome. Alternatively spliced transcript variants encoding different isoforms have been found for this gene.

== Research ==
The protein may play a role in syncytia formation during COVID-19 infection.

== See also ==
- Phospholipid scramblase
