= GPV (disambiguation) =

GPV may refer to:

- Gereformeerd Politiek Verbond, political party in the Netherlands
- GP5 (gene), a human gene
- GNU Public Virus, a pejorative name dates back to a year after the GPLv1 was released
- GPV, a test system design for General Purpose Test Vehicle
