= Collagen receptor =

Cell surface receptors

Collagen receptors are membrane proteins that bind the extracellular matrix protein collagen, the most abundant protein in mammals. They control mainly cell proliferation, migration and adhesion, coagulation cascade activation and they affect ECM structure by regulation of MMP (matrix metalloproteinases).

There are at least eight human collagen receptors.

== Platelet membrane glycoproteins ==
Platelet membrane glycoproteins, mainly GPIa/IIa, GPVI and probably GPIV as well, function as receptors engaged in platelet adhesion to collagen. The leading role in the elimination of high-stress injury is taken by the glycoprotein Ib-IX-V complex.

== Integrins ==
Integrins function as the major cell receptor for extracellular matrix protein. These receptors comprise an α and β transmembrane subunit, which are noncovalently bound. Collagen binding is primarily provided by integrins α1β1, α2β1, α10β1 and α11β1.

Integrin α1β1 binds to collagen via the MIDAS motif in the α subunit I domain. It preferentially binds collagens IV, VI and type XIII collagen, but also fibril-forming collagens. Specific binding sites in collagen I and IV have been identified. This receptor is situated mainly on mesenchymal cells. Functions include: fibroblast proliferation; regulation of collagen synthesis and MMP expression; response to renal injury.

Integrin α2β1 preferentially binds fibril-forming collagens. Specific binding sites in collagen I and III have been identified. Integrin α2β1 is expressed mainly on epithelial cells and platelets. Functions include: platelet adhesion - the most abundant receptor for collagen in platelets; branching morphogenesis; mast cell activation; keratinocyte adhesion and it is the main regulator of cell migration.

Integrin α10β1 preferentially binds collagens IV and VI, but also collagen II. It is expressed on chondrocytes and cardiac muscle. Involved in growth plate morphogenesis and function.

Integrin α11β1 is expressed by mesenchymal cells in some parts of embryo during its development and also in muscles in adults: it preferably binds fibrillar collagen. Integrin receptors capable of collagen binding could, according to results of (Garnotel R et al. 2000), include integrin α10β2, which is situated on monocytes and binds type I collagen.

== Discoidin domain receptors ==
Discoidin domain receptors form a subgroup of receptor tyrosine kinases. Receptor activation happens when collagen binds into preformed DDR dimers on cell membrane, when collagen is bound, a conformational change probably occurs, which causes cytosolic kinases to rotate to face each other, and their autophosphorylation. The exact way of receptor activation is unknown so far. Unlike other tyrosine-kinase receptors, maximal activation of receptors occurs 18 hours after collagen stimulation. They function as receptors for different collagen types, they recognize many fibrillar collagens and they are capable of binding some nonfibrillar collagens as well. Nevertheless, the native conformation of collagen is a requirement for receptor binding, denatured collagen is not bound. DDRs are expressed widely already during development and level of expression is high in adults as well.

DDR1 is a homodimer. Its ectodomain consists of a collagen-binding discoidin domain followed by ~200 residues of unknown structure. It binds fibril-forming collagens and primarily type IV collagen, but also collagen of types I, VI, VIII. It is expressed mainly in epithelial cells and leukocytes and expression rate changes due to cell cycle phase. Functions include: mammary gland development; arterial wound repair; regulation of cell proliferation, cell adhesion and MMP expression; kidney function, differentiation and function of leukocytes.

DDR2 structure as above. Binds fibril-forming collagens, collagen of types I, II, III and X. A specific binding site in collagen II has been identified. It is specific for mesenchymal cells. Functions include: Chondrocyte proliferation and bone growth; regulation of cell proliferation, cell adhesion and induction of MMP expression.

== Immunoglobulin-like receptors ==
Glycoprotein VI Receptor GPVI belongs to immunoglobulin family of glycoproteins. It consists of two extramembrane immunoglobulin domains, which are associated with extracellular glycosylated mucine and together they form a stalk. Another part of the receptor consists of transmembrane helix with a short cytosolic domain. A FcRγ chain with ITAM (immunoreceptor tyrosine-based activation motif) domain is associated with the transmembrane domain. The short cytosolic domain interacts with calmodulin and Src kinases Lyn and Fyn. These Src kinases phosphorylate tyrosine in ITAM domain and activate a signalling cascade. Glycoprotein VI belongs to collagen receptors that are primarily expressed on platelets surface. Together with integrin receptor α2β1 they provide coagulation cascade activation when a blood-vessel is damaged. When damage occurs, endothelial collagen is uncovered and is bound by GPVI receptor on platelets. This interaction activates signalling cascades leading to coagulation factors release. Mainly fibrillar collagens type I and III serve as ligands. Functions include: Platelet adhesion and activation - the most important platelet collagen receptor in terms of signaling.

LAIR1(Leukocyte-associated IG-like receptor) works as inhibition signal for different immune cells. Lair-1 consists of Ig domain, transmembrane helix and a short cytosolic domain, which includes two inhibition motifs (ITIMs), which can block tyrosine domain when activated. A ligand of Lair-1 receptor is type XVII transmembrane collagen, it binds type I and III collagen as well. Collagen binding inhibits Lair-1 function.

== Mannose receptors ==
Mannose receptor provide reception of extracellular ligands. To the family of mannose receptors belong: mannose receptor, M-phospholipase A2 receptor (PLA2R), Dec-205, Endo180/uPARAP. They share and extracellular domain, which contains N-terminal domain rich in cystein, F2 fibronectin type II domain and several C-lectin domains. From this mannose family, collagen is specifically bound by mannose receptor, M-phospholipase A2 receptor and Endo180 receptor. Binding of collagen or denatured collagen (gelatin) is provided by F2 domain and partly by C-terminal domain (aa 1000-1453), which binds type I collagen triple helix. Inability to internalize collagen and reduced ability of adhesion and related increased migration in collagen matrix was observed in fibroblast population with nonfunctional Endo180 receptor. The exact principal of collagen binding to mannose receptor is not known so far. Endo180 receptor is expressed on fibroblasts, endothelial cells and macrophages.
