= Platelet-mimicking particle =

Bioengineered construct

Platelet-mimicking particles are bioengineered constructs that functionally replicate the size, shape, and mechanical properties of natural platelets, which assist various hemostatic mechanisms. Also known as synthetic platelets, these biosynthetic particles are recent advancements in the field of drug delivery where they enable targeted interactions that enhance hemostasis, minimize bleeding risks, and support localized therapies. Their applications extend to thrombosis, inflammation, and cancer treatment, as well as significant potential in trauma care, cardiovascular therapies, and immunotherapy. They also address limitations of natural platelet transfusions, such as limited availability, short shelf life, and safety concerns.

The design and manufacture of platelet-mimicking particles is diverse across current methods and involves precise biomaterial selection, nanoparticle engineering, surface functionalization, and scalable production techniques. Many of these designs include decorating microspheres with specialized antibodies and peptides that can bind to circulating tumor cells and facilitate their removal or altering their shape upon thrombin exposure to accelerate wound healing. Another approach engineers these platelets with a discoidal shape and flexible polymer composition to mimic platelet deformation under shear forces. While these varied approaches aim to optimize surface interactions and hemostatic performance for multiple therapeutic applications, current research on synthetic platelets is primarily in the preclinical stage. The majority of synthetic platelet studies rely on animal models to assess their safety, efficacy, and hemostatic performance. In various experimental models, platelet-mimicking particles have demonstrated the ability to reduce bleeding and improve survival rates, which mirrors the fundamental functions of natural platelets. While these findings suggest promising therapeutic applications, further research is required to refine synthetic platelet designs that ensure long-term safety and facilitate clinical translation for human use.

== Overview ==
Platelet-mimicking particles, an innovation of drug delivery since the mid-twentieth century, are designed to mimic the functionality of natural platelets, with ongoing research focusing on optimizing their biocompatibility, clot integration, and targeted delivery capabilities. Advances in nanotechnology and molecular engineering have enabled the development of platelet-mimicking drug delivery systems. Current research aims to replicate key platelet functions such as adhesion, aggregation, and clotting to enhance hemostatic responses and targeted therapies. Primary synthetic platelet preparations involve nanoscale polymeric architectures, peptides, or extracellular vesicles to improve biocompatibility and therapeutic efficacy. Current iterations of synthetic platelets - hydrogel-based nanoparticles that mimic the size, mechanics, and shape of natural platelets - have demonstrated efficacy in promoting clotting and wound healing in preclinical studies involving rodents and pigs.

Originally designed to improve patient outcomes related to hemostasis, synthetic platelets are now being explored in other therapeutic areas including immune modulation and anticancer treatment. For example, a recent platelet design engineered for anticancer treatment can be freeze-dried and rehydrated when needed, offering a longer shelf life compared to natural platelets, which typically degrade rapidly when stored. This advancement could allow for assisted transport, making synthetic platelets a viable option in healthcare locations with limited resources, such as rural hospitals, ambulances, and battlefield settings.

While preclinical results are encouraging, challenges remain in the large-scale clinical translation of synthetic platelets. Reproducibility, large-scale production, and safety issues must be addressed to gain regulatory approval and commercial viability. Researchers continue to refine synthetic platelet formulations by maximizing circulation time, stability, and biodegradability while minimizing undesirable immune responses. Additionally, studies have shown that synthetic platelets are excreted from the body within hours if they do not reach a wound site, which reduces the risk of unintended clotting in other parts of the body.

== Background on native platelets ==
Native platelets play a vital role in hemostasis, the process of blood clotting and wound healing. Also known as thrombocytes, platelets are anucleate cell fragments derived from megakaryocytes in the bone marrow. Under healthy conditions, platelets circulate in an inactive state within the bloodstream and rapidly respond to vascular injury by initiating a complex cascade of coagulation events to prevent excessive blood loss. Native platelets are 2-3 micrometers in diameter and possess a highly specialized structure that enables their function in clot formation. Their cytoplasm contains dense granules and alpha granules, which store essential molecules such as adenosine diphosphate (ADP), serotonin, fibrinogen, and growth factors. These molecules are important for platelet activation, adhesion, and recruitment of additional platelets during vascular injury. The platelet membrane contains an abundance of glycoproteins, including integrins and receptors like glycoprotein Ib-IX-V and glycoprotein IIb/IIIa, which mediate interactions with the vascular endothelium and other platelets. A cytoskeleton composed of actin and tubulin allows platelets to change shape during activation, which extends filopodia to enhance adhesion and clot stability.

Platelets engage in the following three-step process to form a stable blood clot: adhesion, activation, and aggregation. When endothelial damage exposes the underlying extracellular matrix, adhesion begins in which von Willebrand factor binds to collagen, causing the recruitment of platelets through interactions with glycoprotein Ib receptors. This initial attachment allows platelets to stick to the damaged vessel wall. Upon adhesion, platelets undergo morphological changes and release bioactive molecules from their granules—signifying activation. Molecules like ADP and thromboxane A₂ increase the activation signal, which calls more circulating platelets to the injury site. Activation also leads to the expression of phosphatidylserine on the membrane surface. This acts as a catalytic platform for the coagulation cascade. Lastly, aggregation is performed as activated platelets express glycoprotein IIb/IIIa receptors, which bind fibrinogen and facilitate platelet-platelet interactions. This, in turn, leads to clot formation and stabilization and reinforces the platelet plug by converting fibrinogen into an insoluble fibrin mesh.

Platelets also have a key role in immune responses, inflammation, and tissue repair through their interactions with leukocytes and endothelial cells. To recruit immune cells to injury sites, activated platelets can release cytokines and chemokines such as platelet factor 4 (PF4) and transforming growth factor-beta (TGF-β). They also form platelet-leukocyte aggregates, which further enhance neutrophil and monocyte activation, in turn supporting pathogen clearance and inflammatory signaling. Platelets also promote angiogenesis and tissue regeneration to maintain overall vascular integrity by releasing growth factors like vascular endothelial growth factor (VEGF) and platelet-derived growth factor (PDGF). Their multifunctional role displays the challenge of innovating synthetic platelets capable of effectively replicating their physiological functions.

== Need for Platelet-mimicking particles ==
Despite the vital role of native platelets in hemostasis, their limitations - such as short shelf life, donor dependence, and transfusion-related risks - have presented a need for synthetic alternatives. These challenges inform the need for synthetic solutions that can replicate platelet functions while also minimizing these drawbacks and thus decrease adverse bleeding events. A primary limitation of native platelets is their limited shelf life, typically ranging from 5 to 7 days which complicates their storage and distribution. This short window increases the difficulty to maintain an adequate supply of platelets, especially in emergency situations or regions with limited access to donor blood. Additionally, platelet transfusions are associated with risks such as immune reactions, bacterial infections, and transmission of blood-borne diseases. These risks arise due to potential contamination during blood collection, processing, and storage. Given these challenges, synthetic platelets offer a solution by providing a longer-lasting and more accessible alternative.

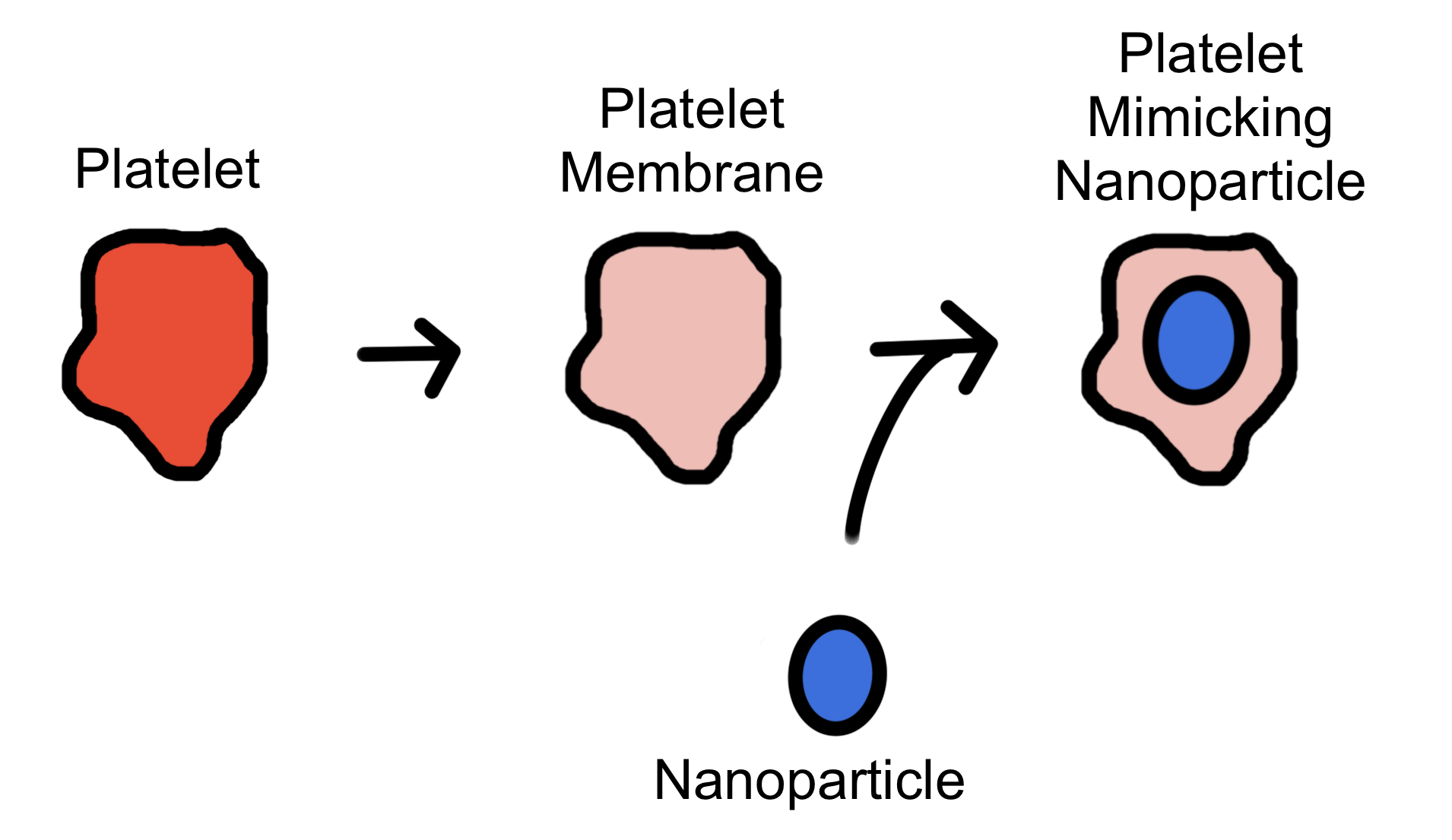
Figure 1. Schematic representation of the fabrication process for platelet-mimicking nanoparticles. Native platelets are first processed to extract their membrane components. These platelet-derived membranes are then coated onto synthetic nanoparticles (blue) to create platelet-mimetic nanoparticles for targeted vascular therapy.

More recent advances in synthetic platelet technology have focused on biomimetic approaches to replicate the essential functions of native platelets known as adhesion, aggregation, and clot formation. Platelet-mimetic nanoparticles are designed to imitate platelet behavior without the systemic risks associated with transfusion. These constructs can self-assemble into structures that bind to tumor endothelial cells and transform into nanofibers, initiating artificial coagulation at targeted sites. This ability to localize coagulation without systemic effects is being further researched for applications in treating both bleeding disorders and cancer, where controlled clotting is necessary to achieve positive patient outcomes.

Emerging solutions for blood transfusions also aim to address current limitations of donor platelet products. Recent research has focused on creating synthetic platelet analogs that enable engineered constructs to selectively bind to thrombus sites, potentially enhancing the precision of clotting therapies for conditions such as thrombosis. Furthermore, integrating these platelet-mimetic features into drug delivery vehicles offers the potential for targeted therapies in cardiovascular disease, anti-inflammation treatments, and immunotherapies. Addressing safety, enhancing production methods, and managing regulatory approvals are challenges that need to be resolved before synthetic platelets can enter human clinical trial development and be routinely used in practice.

== Design and manufacture ==
The design and manufacture of PMPs involves biomaterial selection, nanoparticle engineering, surface functionalization, and scalable production techniques to mimic the structure, function, and biomechanical properties of native platelets.

One such design is a nanohair decorated microsphere made by a research group. These are small particles created from a combination of polystyrene, polyaniline (PANi), and epithelial cell adhesion molecule (EpCAM) antibodies that bind to circulating tumor cells. These spheres are designed to have a 1μm diameter created with the polystyrene molecules where the inner layer is hydrophilic to surround the core. The PANi is used to create nanohairs that simulate the natural aggregation of platelets. These nanohairs are attached to the surface of the polystyrene nanoparticles and range in length from 100 to 800 nm. The EpCAM antibodies are also attached to the nanospheres and are capable of binding to the EpCAM of circulating tumor cells in order to capture and remove them from circulation.

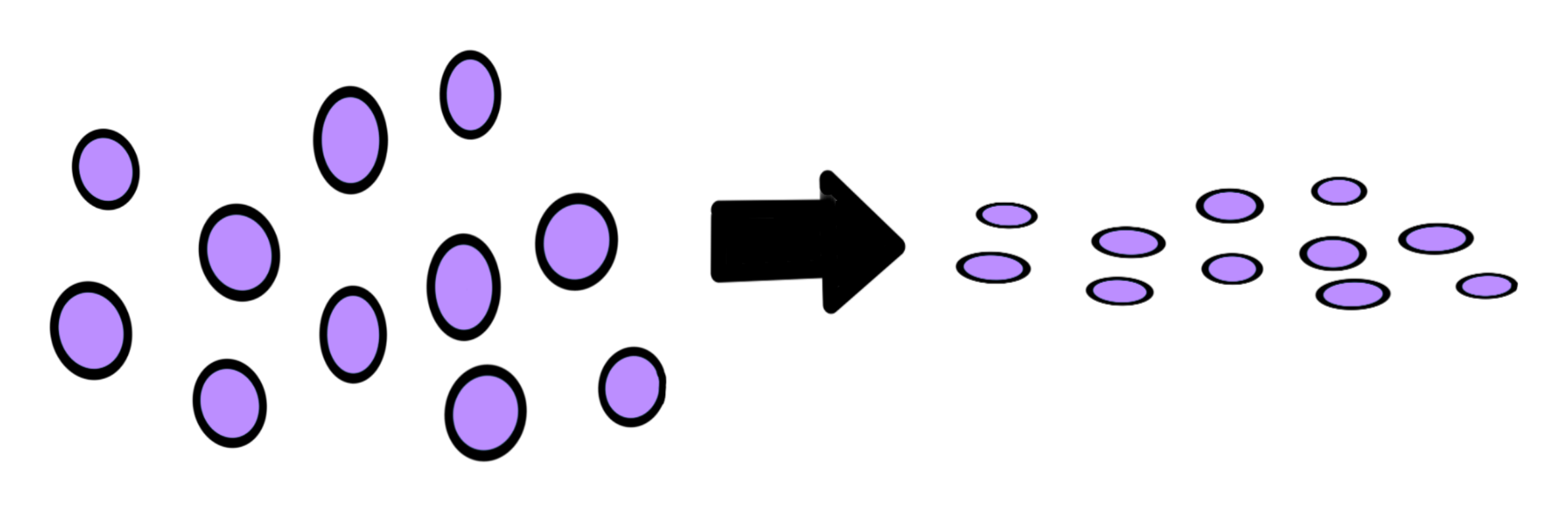
Figure 2. This figure illustrates the activation process of thrombin-sensitive platelet-like particles (TS-PLPs). On the left, the unactivated TS-PLPs are depicted as dispersed, spherical particles, representing their initial state before encountering thrombin. Upon exposure to thrombin, shown by the black arrow, the TS-PLPs undergo a shape transformation, becoming flattened and more interconnected, as seen on the right side of the image. This activated state mimics natural platelet deformation, enhancing clot contraction and promoting wound healing.

Another research group has developed a platelet-mimicking particle with conformational flexibility to enhance clotting during vascular injury. Since natural platelets deform to increase surface area and promote clot formation, replicating this behavior in synthetic platelets is crucial. Their thrombin-sensitive platelet-like particles (TS-PLPs) were designed to respond to thrombin, a key clotting enzyme. The fabrication process involved modifying microgels with a custom peptide sequence, followed by the synthesis of thrombin-sensitive nanogels via precipitation polymerization. These nanogels were then functionalized with fibrin-binding motifs to create the final PLPs. When exposed to thrombin, the TS-PLPs alter their shape, improving clot contraction and accelerating wound healing compared to non-thrombin-sensitive PLPs.

Additionally, researchers have developed platelet-like nanoparticles that replicate key attributes of natural platelets, including their discoidal shape, mechanical flexibility, ability to aggregate biophysically and biochemically, and targeted adhesion to vascular injury sites. The design process involved fabricating discoidal nanoparticles using a top-down lithographic approach to achieve precise shape and size control. To mimic platelet flexibility, the nanoparticles were composed of biocompatible polymers that allow deformation under shear forces, similar to natural platelets. Surface functionalization was performed to introduce multiple ligands, enabling specific interactions with von Willebrand Factor, collagen, and activated platelets. This approach aims to enhance the effectiveness of synthetic platelets in therapeutic applications by improving their ability to respond to vascular injuries.

== Animal models ==
Current research on synthetic platelets primarily in preclinical phases of clinical trials, relying on animal models to test their safety, efficacy, and hemostatic performance in relevant therapeutic areas. In one study, researchers evaluated the efficacy of platelet-mimicking procoagulant nanoparticles (PPNs) using various animal models. In a mouse model of thrombocytopenia, induced by administering an anti-CD42b antibody to reduce platelet counts, PPNs were introduced and demonstrated a reduction in bleeding comparable to that achieved with syngeneic platelet transfusions. Additionally, in a rat model of acute liver injury and a mouse model of hemorrhagic trauma, treatment with PPNs led to decreased blood loss and improved survival rates compared to control groups receiving saline or control nanoparticles. These findings suggest that PPNs effectively mimic natural platelet functions, enhancing hemostasis in scenarios of significant bleeding.

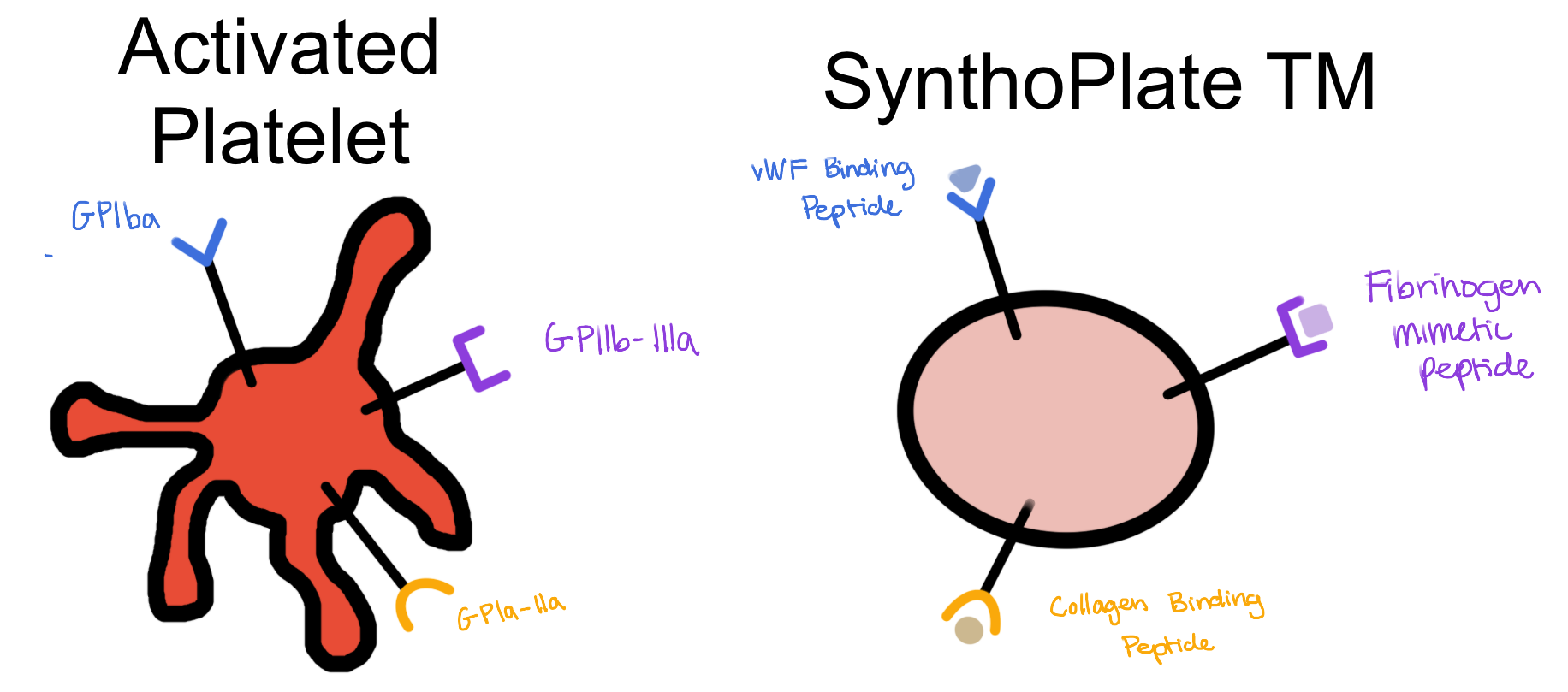
Figure 3. Surface molecules decorated on an activated platelet (left) and SynthoPlate (right), a synthetic hemostatic nanotechnology designed to mimic natural platelet interactions. Activated platelets express key surface receptors, including GPIbα (blue), GPIIb-IIIa (purple), and GPIa-IIa (gold), which facilitate adhesion and aggregation at sites of vascular injury. SynthoPlate incorporates functional peptides that mimic these interactions: a von Willebrand Factor (vWF) binding peptide (blue), a fibrinogen mimetic peptide (purple), and a collagen binding peptide (gold). These components enable SynthoPlate™ to support clot formation and hemostasis in bleeding injuries, as developed by Haima Therapeutics.^{17}

In another study, researchers evaluated synthetic platelet (SP) nanoparticles in mouse models of von Willebrand disease (vWD). In vitro, SPs enhanced thrombus formation under vWF-deficient conditions using human platelets. In vivo, SP treatment reduced blood loss by 35% in type 2B VWD mice and 68% in vWF knockout mice. These findings suggest that SPs may offer a promising therapeutic approach for managing bleeding in vWD.

In vitro studies on SynthoPlate assessed its impact on thrombin and fibrin generation to evaluate its procoagulant potential. SynthoPlate did not induce spontaneous thrombin generation in human plasma but enhanced fibrin deposition under flow conditions by promoting platelet recruitment and aggregation on a collagen and vWF-coated surface. In vivo, a thrombocytopenic mouse model was used to assess SynthoPlate's hemostatic efficacy. Mice treated with SynthoPlate exhibited significantly reduced bleeding times following tail transection compared to controls, with effects observed within a two-hour circulation period. Immunostaining and immunoblotting confirmed enhanced fibrin formation at the injury site, indicating that SynthoPlate effectively supports clot formation in platelet-deficient conditions.

== Future directions ==
Future research on PMPs aims to refine their design, enhance biocompatibility, and expand their therapeutic applications. Efforts are focused on improving hemostatic performance by integrating biomimetic molecular, structural, and biophysical features, such as targeted peptide modifications, procoagulant components, and optimized particle geometry. Additionally, researchers are exploring the combination of synthetic platelet systems with other blood components to develop biosynthetic whole blood substitutes. Key challenges include ensuring scalability, assessing long-term safety, and evaluating immunogenic risks, particularly for repeated dosing. Ongoing research is focused on optimizing these factors through interdisciplinary collaboration to facilitate clinical translation.

== Uses ==
Synthetic platelets have diverse therapeutic applications, including treating hemostasis in trauma care, clotting disorders, and immune responses in conditions such as thrombosis, inflammation, and cancer. Originally researched to replicate the biochemistry and cell and molecular biology of natural platelets, platelet-mimicking particles are now in preclinical development for multiple therapeutic applications with specialized drug delivery mechanisms. The need for these particles is informed by increasing rates of reported thrombocytopenia cases and clinical bleeding syndrome diagnoses such as von Willebrand disease or Glanzmann thrombasthenia. Early treatment solutions of the mid-late twentieth century were not based upon current findings in nanoparticle drug delivery technologies, thus lacking the ability to overcome primary limitations of natural platelets. With a diverse assortment of platelet-mimicking particle formulations under testing, their use can be widespread to multiple clinical diagnoses and areas—antimicrobial platelets, cancer, hemorrhage and trauma, bleeding disorders, and cholesterol clearance.

=== Antimicrobial Platelets ===
Platelet-mimicking particles engineered with antimicrobial properties offer a novel approach to combating infections by targeting pathogens at injury sites, enhancing immune responses, and delivering antimicrobial agents directly to affected areas. While platelets are often recognized for their hemostatic role, more recent research focuses on their ability to fight infections by releasing antimicrobial molecules and through interactions with immune cells. Building on these properties, synthetic antimicrobial platelets can be an attractive targeted therapy for preventing and treating infections, particularly in trauma, surgery, and immunocompromised patients.

An approach to developing antimicrobial platelet-like particles (PLPs) involves the integration of nanosilver— a material known for its potent antimicrobial activity. Recent findings have reported that nanosilver composite PNIPAM microgels incorporated into PLPs (Ag-PLPs) effectively inhibited bacterial growth while maintaining key platelet functions such as deformability and clot retraction.^{4} This balance is needed in order for antimicrobial synthetic platelets to induce wound healing as well as hemostasis, while keeping infection risk at minimum. Ag-PLPs, in a wound experimental model, not only increased clot retraction but also performance of healing, suggesting its regard as a "two-in-one therapy" for high-risk infection trauma patients.

Natural platelet-derived antimicrobial peptides have been discovered to play pivotal roles in platelet-dependent immune response beyond synthetic modifications. Platelet microbicidal proteins (PMPs), kinocidins, and cationic host defense peptides (CHDPs) are active against a wide range of pathogens through membrane disruption and immune signaling. By mimicking or enhancing these natural antimicrobial functions, synthetic platelets can potentially serve as a novel therapeutic tool for infection prevention.

The implementation of antimicrobial platelets are relevant in the context of currently increasing rates of antibiotic resistance and hospital-acquired infection. Compared to conventional antibiotics, artificial platelets may be able to deliver a localized and specific response to infection, which limits the necessity for systemic antimicrobial therapy and decreases the potential for resistance emergence. As research on this subject continues to grow, antimicrobial platelets may be of consideration in trauma medicine, postoperative recovery, and other clinical practices to optimize immune defense.

=== Cancer ===
Current clinical trials testing synthetic platelets offer a promising strategy for oncology applications by facilitating targeted drug delivery to tumors and reducing off-target toxicity in cancer therapy. Natural platelets were reported to interact with cancer cells through mechanisms such as immune evasion, angiogenesis, and metastasis.

Specific to oncology, synthetic platelets are applied using targeted drug delivery. Platelet-mimicking nanoparticles developed from self-assembling peptides were found to adhere to tumor endothelial cells and induce localized coagulation, forming artificial clots that disrupt tumor vasculature. This approach reduces blood supply to the tumor, effectively starving cancer cells while preventing metastatic spread. Furthermore, synthetic platelets designed to deliver chemotherapy drugs can leverage natural platelet-tumor interactions to deliver drugs directly to cancerous cells, which has been seen to reduce off-target effects and improve therapeutic outcomes.

Immunotherapy and radiation sensitization are additional application areas of platelet-mimicking particles. Platelet-inspired nanomedicine uses extracellular vesicles and platelet-derived biomaterials to enhance immune responses against tumors. These biomimetic platforms can be designed to carry immune checkpoint inhibitors and pro-inflammatory cytokines, which can help overcome immune evasion mechanisms employed by cancer cells. Furthermore, synthetic platelet-based drug carriers can be loaded with radiosensitizers, which also improve the effectiveness of radiation therapy by increasing tumor susceptibility to radiation-induced damage. Another advantage of platelet-based treatments is their potential to overcome drug resistance—a danger of current cancer treatment options. By acting as sentinels in the bloodstream, platelets naturally take up proteins and genetic material. New treatments can leverage this for real-time biomarker detection and therapeutic monitoring. This application provides the basis for the development of liquid biopsies based on platelets to track disease progression and treatment efficacy.

One of the largest constraints is the challenge of mimicking natural platelet interactions with cancer cells without accidentally stimulating cancer growth or metastasis. Natural platelets play a dual role in cancer progression in that they can help the immune system fight tumors but also facilitate cancer cell survival and metastasis by shielding circulating tumor cells from immune attack. Synthetic platelets must be carefully engineered to retain their therapeutic benefits while avoiding unintended interactions that could enhance tumor growth. Additionally, the stability, circulation time, and biodegradability of the synthetic platelets must be optimized for long-term therapeutic action without triggering unwanted immune responses. To maintain effectiveness, platelet-mimicking particles have to be engineered to remain stable in the bloodstream long enough to reach tumor sites without being rapidly cleared. Simultaneously, they must also be designed to degrade safely after successful drug delivery to tumor sites to avoid triggering adverse immune reactions. Regulatory issues and mass production also become problematic because safety and efficacy evaluation of the synthetic platelet requires extensive preclinical and clinical testing. Overcoming these deficiencies will advance their integration into standard oncological treatments.

=== Hemorrhage and trauma ===
Synthetic platelets have the potential to aid trauma care by rapidly enhancing hemostasis, reducing blood loss, and improving survival outcomes in hemorrhagic injuries.

SynthoPlate, a liposome-based synthetic platelet surrogate, has been designed to mimic both platelet adhesion and aggregation mechanisms through heteromultivalent surface modifications. Studies have demonstrated that SynthoPlate maintains stability after sterilization via filtration and E-beam irradiation and remains viable during long-term suspension storage. In a porcine arterial injury model, a single intravenous dose of SynthoPlate resulted in 100% survival during the first hour post-injury, compared to 0% in saline-treated controls. Unlike unmodified liposomes, SynthoPlate was shown to enhance hemostasis while stabilizing mean arterial pressure, reducing blood loss, and improving survival outcomes. These findings suggest that platelet-mimicking nanoparticles could serve as a viable transfusion alternative for hemorrhage management in pre-hospital and battlefield settings.

Peptide-based nanoparticles (pNPs) have been studied for their potential in hemorrhage control by mimicking natural clot formation. In vitro experiments demonstrated that pNPs, when incubated with CD105 and red blood cells, formed stable artificial clots with fibrous networks similar to natural thrombi. These clots resisted enzymatic degradation, maintaining structural integrity unlike natural fibrin clots. Further testing in a microfluidic blood vessel model lined with human endothelial cells showed that pNPs triggered a self-amplifying coagulation-like process, forming nanofibrous structures that occluded sections of the artificial vessel. These findings suggest that pNPs could serve as a synthetic alternative for enhancing clot formation and improving hemorrhage management in trauma care.

=== Bleeding disorders ===
Platelet-mimicking nanoparticles are under preclinical investigation for their potential to mitigate bleeding in conditions such as thrombocytopenia, coagulopathy, and von Willebrand disease. While pNPs had not previously been tested for congenital bleeding disorders, recent studies suggest their ability to enhance hemostasis in VWD type 2B and vWF-deficient conditions. In vitro experiments demonstrated that SP improved platelet recruitment and thrombus formation under thrombocytopenic and vWF-deficient conditions. In vivo studies further showed that pNPs reduced bleeding in VWD-2B mice and achieved near-complete hemostatic correction in vWF-knockout models, likely by providing a surface for platelet adhesion and fibrin deposition. The nanoparticles' stability, extended circulation time, and ability to be tailored with procoagulant molecules suggest their potential as a novel therapeutic approach for severe VWD and other bleeding disorders.

=== Cholesterol clearance ===
Synthetic platelets are being explored for their potential in cholesterol clearance by facilitating the targeted removal of cholesterol from the bloodstream, offering a novel approach to treating hypercholesterolemia and preventing cardiovascular diseases. Elevated low-density lipoprotein cholesterol (LDL-C) is a key contributor to coronary heart disease, largely regulated by the interaction between LDL receptors (LDLR) and Proprotein Convertase Subtilisin/Kexin Type 9 (PCSK9). Since PCSK9 reduces LDLR availability, inhibiting it can enhance LDL-C clearance. To explore this, researchers designed platelet-mimicking nanoparticles to deliver siRNA targeting Pcsk9. These nanoparticles effectively lowered Pcsk9 mRNA levels by 66% in cell studies and reduced plasma LDL-C by 28% in animal models, without significantly altering high-density lipoprotein cholesterol (HDL-C) or triglycerides (TGs). This strategy demonstrates the potential of biomimetic nanoparticles for RNA-based therapies aimed at treating high cholesterol.

== See also ==
- Platelet
- Thrombocytopenia
- Coagulation
- Platelet Transfusion
- Antiplatelet drug
