= Scott syndrome =

- Other names: Platelet factor X receptor deficiency
- This condition is inherited in an autosomal recessive manner
- Frequency: 0.0001%

Scott syndrome is a rare congenital bleeding disorder that is due to a defect in a platelet mechanism required for blood coagulation.

Normally when a vascular injury occurs (i.e., a cut, scrape or other injury that causes bleeding), platelets are activated and phosphatidylserine (PS) in the inner leaflet of the platelet membrane is transported to the outer leaflet of the platelet membrane, where it provides a binding site for plasma protein complexes that are involved in the conversion of prothrombin to thrombin, such as factor VIIIa-IXa (tenase) and factor Va-Xa (prothrombinase).

In Scott syndrome, the mechanism for translocating PS to the platelet membrane is defective, resulting in impaired thrombin formation. A similar defect in PS translocation has also been demonstrated in Scott syndrome red blood cells and Epstein–Barr virus transformed lymphocytes, suggesting that the defect in Scott syndrome reflects a mutation in a stem cell that affects multiple hematological lineages.

The basis for the defect in PS translocation is, at present, unknown. A candidate protein, scramblase, that may be involved in this process appears to be normal in Scott syndrome platelets. Other possible defects in PS translocation, reported in some patients, require further study. The initially reported patient with Scott syndrome has been found to have a mutation at a splice-acceptor site of the gene encoding anoctamin 6 (ANO6, transmembrane protein 16F, TMEM16F). At present, the only treatment for episodes of bleeding is the transfusion of normal platelets.
