= CDP-diacylglycerol—serine O-phosphatidyltransferase =

Class of enzymes

CDP-diacylglycerol-serine O-phosphatidyltransferase

Identifiers
- EC no.: 2.7.8.8
- CAS no.: 9068-48-8

Databases
- IntEnz: IntEnz view
- BRENDA: BRENDA entry
- ExPASy: NiceZyme view
- KEGG: KEGG entry
- MetaCyc: metabolic pathway
- PRIAM: profile
- PDB structures: RCSB PDB PDBe PDBsum
- Gene Ontology: AmiGO / QuickGO
Search
- PMC: articles
- PubMed: articles
- NCBI: proteins

In enzymology, a CDP-diacylglycerol—serine O-phosphatidyltransferase (EC 2.7.8.8) is an enzyme that catalyzes the chemical reaction

CDP-diacylglycerol + L-serine $\rightleftharpoons$ CMP + (3-sn-phosphatidyl)-L-serine

Thus, the two substrates of this enzyme are CDP-diacylglycerol and L-serine, whereas its two products are CMP and (3-sn-phosphatidyl)-L-serine.

This enzyme belongs to the family of transferases, specifically those transferring non-standard substituted phosphate groups. The systematic name of this enzyme class is CDP-diacylglycerol:L-serine 3-sn-phosphatidyltransferase. Other names in common use include phosphatidylserine synthase, CDPdiglyceride-serine O-phosphatidyltransferase, PS synthase, cytidine 5'-diphospho-1,2-diacyl-sn-glycerol, (CDPdiglyceride):L-serine O-phosphatidyltransferase, phosphatidylserine synthetase, CDP-diacylglycerol-L-serine O-phosphatidyltransferase, cytidine diphosphoglyceride-serine O-phosphatidyltransferase, CDP-diglyceride-L-serine phosphatidyltransferase, CDP-diglyceride:serine phosphatidyltransferase, cytidine 5'-diphospho-1,2-diacyl-sn-glycerol:L-serine, O-phosphatidyltransferase, and CDP-diacylglycerol:L-serine 3-O-phosphatidyltransferase. This enzyme participates in glycine, serine and threonine metabolism and glycerophospholipid metabolism.
