= Pseudothrombocytopenia =

Pseudothrombocytopenia (PTCP) or spurious thrombocytopenia is an in-vitro sampling problem which may mislead the diagnosis towards the more critical condition of thrombocytopenia. The phenomenon may occur when the anticoagulant used while testing the blood sample causes clumping of platelets which mimics a low platelet count. The phenomenon has first been reported in 1969.

== Causes ==
=== EDTA-dependent agglutination ===
In some individuals, clinically insignificant antibodies may cause in vitro agglutination of platelets. As a result of platelet clumping, platelet counts reported by automated counters may be much lower than the actual count in the blood because these devices cannot differentiate platelet clumps from individual cells. Pseudothrombocytopenia has been reported in association with the use of EDTA as an anticoagulant, with platelet cold agglutinins, and with multiple myeloma. Other risk factors associated with pseudothrombocytopenia are autoimmune diseases, infections, pregnancy and the treatment with some medications such as low-molecular-weight heparin, valproic acid, insulin, antibiotics and chemotherapy medications like sunitinib.

The prevalence of pseudothrombocytopenia in K2-EDTA reported in different studies ranges from 0.03 to 0.27 percent in outpatients, which accounts for 15 to 30 percent of all cases of isolated thrombocytopenia. Tests can mistake small clumps of platelets for leukocytes, thus showing a pseudoleukocytosis in blood counts.

=== Platelet satellitism ===
Platelet rosetting, or satelliting, around white blood cells can lead to undercounting by automated analyzers.

=== Clotted samples ===
Coagulation within the sample leads to undercounting, because the analyzer samples the liquid part of the blood, while some of the platelets remain in the tube, trapped in the clot. Overfilling the sample, or inadequately mixing with anticoagulant, may allow small clots to form. Unlike platelet clumps, clots usually cannot be detected by reviewing the peripheral blood smear, but may be detected by probing with wooden sticks, including checking under the cap.

== Failsafes and avoiding false-positives ==
A pseudothrombocytopenia false-positive result may occur when automated platelet counting devices are used. As a means of double checking the results, the patient's blood sample is often examined under a microscope. If the clumping is visible and the number of platelets appears normal, pseudothrombocytopenia may be concluded. A second sample run with a different anticoagulant such as sodium citrate (blue top tube) to confirm the finding of pseudothrombocytopenia may be requested if there are doubts or concerns. Other alternative anticoagulants are sodium fluoride, CPT (trisodium citrate, pyridoxal 5′-phosphate and tris), CTAD (citrate, theophylline, adenosine, and dipyridamole), magnesium sulfate and acid-citrate-dextrose.
