= Drug-induced thrombocytopenic purpura =

- Specialty: Dermatology

Drug-induced thrombocytopenic purpura is a skin condition result from a low platelet count due to drug-induced anti-platelet antibodies caused by drugs such as heparin, sulfonamides, digoxin, quinine, and quinidine.

== See also ==
- Idiopathic thrombocytopenic purpura
- Skin lesion
