= Procoagulant platelets =

Procoagulant platelets are a functional subgroup of platelets with distinct properties in physiological haemostasis. Following strong activation, procoagulant platelets express phosphatidylserine on their surface and become highly efficient in sustaining thrombin generation and parallelly gain pro-haemostatic function by retaining α-granule proteins on their membranes. While a low level of procoagulant platelets is associated with impaired platelet function and bleeding diathesis high levels have been shown to worsen thrombotic events.
