= Platelet glycoprotein VI =

Protein-coding gene in the species Homo sapiens

GP6
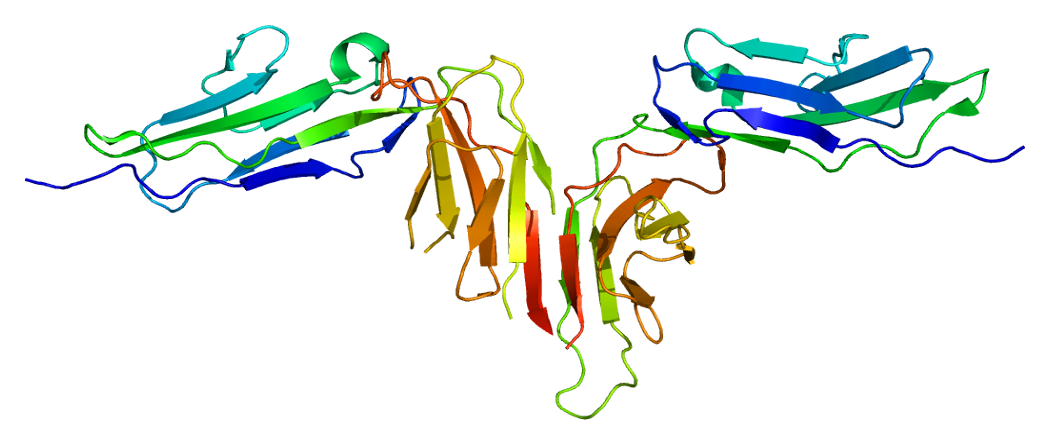

Identifiers
- Aliases: GP6, BDPLT11, GPIV, GPVI, glycoprotein VI platelet
- External IDs: OMIM: 605546; MGI: 1889810; GeneCards: GP6
Available structures
PDB	Ortholog search: PDBe RCSB
PDB	List of PDB id codes 2GI7

Gene location (Human)
Chr.	Chromosome 19 (human)
Band	19q13.42	Start	55,013,705 bp
Band	19q13.42	End	55,038,264 bp

Gene location (Mouse)
Chr.	Chromosome 7 (mouse)
Band	7|7 A1	Start	4,366,964 bp
Band	7|7 A1	End	4,400,743 bp
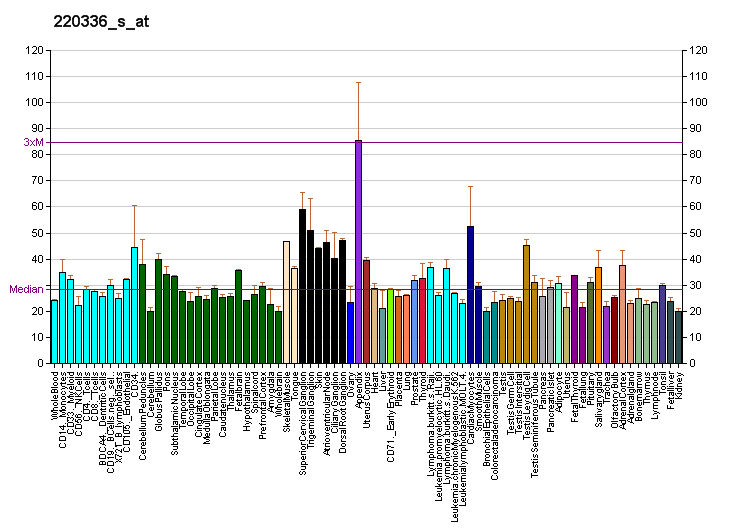
RNA expression pattern
Bgee	Human / Mouse (ortholog); Top expressed in: monocyte; testicle; gonad; blood; granulocyte; cerebellar hemisphere; right hemisphere of cerebellum; bone marrow cell; primary visual cortex; skin of abdomen / Top expressed in: blood; bone marrow; spleen; zygote; yolk sac; genital tubercle; liver; heart; skeleton; leg; More reference expression data
BioGPS	More reference expression data
Gene ontology
Molecular function	protein binding; transmembrane signaling receptor activity; collagen binding; signaling receptor activity
Cellular component	integral component of membrane; cell surface; plasma membrane; tetraspanin-enriched microdomain; extracellular exosome; membrane; integral component of plasma membrane
Biological process	platelet activation; hemostasis; blood coagulation; enzyme linked receptor protein signaling pathway; leukocyte migration
Sources:Amigo / QuickGO
Orthologs
Databases	NCBI: entry; OMA: entry
Species	Human	Mouse
Entrez	51206	243816
Ensembl	ENSG00000088053; ENSG00000274050; ENSG00000278670; ENSG00000276211; ENSG00000277439 ENSG00000278316; ENSG00000275633; ENSG00000274566; ENSG00000275931; ENSG00000276065	ENSMUSG00000078810
UniProt	Q9HCN6	P0C191
RefSeq (mRNA)	NM_016363; NM_001083899; NM_001256017	NM_001163014
RefSeq (protein)	NP_001077368; NP_001242946; NP_057447	NP_001156486
Location (UCSC)	Chr 19: 55.01 – 55.04 Mb	Chr 7: 4.37 – 4.4 Mb
PubMed search
- Wikidata
View/Edit Human	View/Edit Mouse

Platelet glycoprotein VI (GPVI) is a glycoprotein receptor for collagen which is expressed in platelets. In humans, glycoprotein VI is encoded by the GP6 gene. It was first cloned in 2000 by several groups including that of Martine Jandrot-Perrus from INSERM.

== Function ==
GPVI is a 58-kD platelet membrane glycoprotein that plays a crucial role in the collagen-induced activation and aggregation of platelets. Upon injury to the vessel wall and subsequent damage to the endothelial lining, exposure of the subendothelial matrix to blood flow results in deposition of platelets. Collagen fibers are the most thrombogenic macromolecular components of the extracellular matrix, with collagen types I, III, and VI being the major forms found in blood vessels. Platelet interaction with collagen occurs as a 2-step procedure: (1) the initial adhesion to collagen is followed by (2) an activation step leading to platelet secretion, recruitment of additional platelets, and aggregation. In physiologic conditions, the resulting platelet plug is the initial hemostatic event limiting blood loss. However, exposure of collagen after rupture of atherosclerotic plaques is a major stimulus of thrombus formation associated with myocardial infarction or stroke.

Complete or partial deficiency of GPVI in humans is a rare condition presenting as a mild bleeding disorder.

== Interactions ==
GPVI has been shown to interact with LYN.

== See also ==
- Collagen receptor
