= GP5 (gene) =

Protein-coding gene in the species Homo sapiens

Identifiers
- Aliases: GP5, CD42d, GPV, glycoprotein V platelet
- External IDs: OMIM: 173511; MGI: 1096363; GeneCards: GP5

Gene location (Human)
Chr.	Chromosome 3 (human)
Band	3q29	Start	194,394,821 bp
Band	3q29	End	194,399,266 bp

Gene location (Mouse)
Chr.	Chromosome 16 (mouse)
Band	16|16 B2	Start	30,126,503 bp
Band	16|16 B2	End	30,129,597 bp
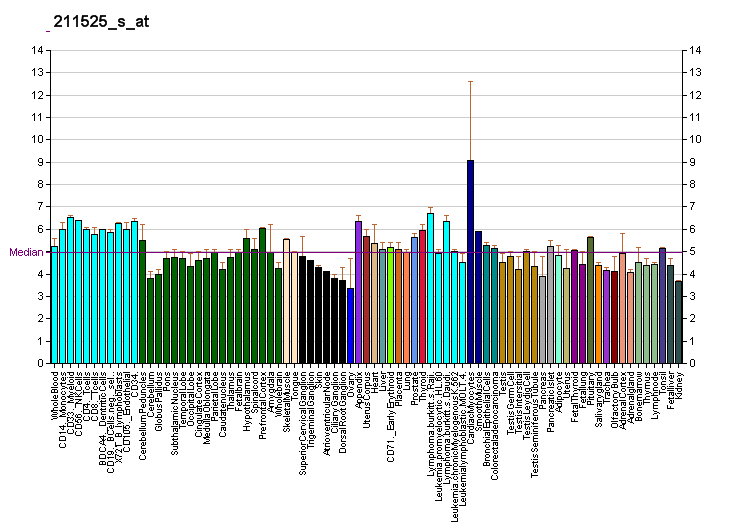
RNA expression pattern
Bgee	Human / Mouse (ortholog); Top expressed in: monocyte; trabecular bone; right uterine tube; bronchial epithelial cell; granulocyte; lymph node; blood; appendix; bone marrow; gallbladder / Top expressed in: tibiofemoral joint; blood; morula; blastocyst; embryo; spleen; embryo; yolk sac; abdominal wall; bone marrow; More reference expression data
BioGPS	More reference expression data
Gene ontology
Molecular function	protein binding
Cellular component	integral component of membrane; plasma membrane; integral component of plasma membrane; extracellular exosome; membrane; extracellular space
Biological process	platelet activation; blood coagulation, intrinsic pathway; hemostasis; cell adhesion; blood coagulation; axonogenesis
Sources:Amigo / QuickGO
Orthologs
Databases	NCBI: entry; OMA: entry
Species	Human	Mouse
Entrez	2814	14729
Ensembl	ENSG00000178732	ENSMUSG00000047953
UniProt	P40197	O08742; Q9QZU3
RefSeq (mRNA)	NM_004488	NM_008148
RefSeq (protein)	NP_004479	NP_032174
Location (UCSC)	Chr 3: 194.39 – 194.4 Mb	Chr 16: 30.13 – 30.13 Mb
PubMed search
- Wikidata
View/Edit Human	View/Edit Mouse

Glycoprotein V (platelet) (GP5) also known as CD42d (Cluster of Differentiation 42d), is a human gene.

Human platelet glycoprotein V (GP5) is a part of the Ib-V-IX system of surface glycoproteins that constitute the receptor for von Willebrand factor (VWF; MIM 193400) and mediate the adhesion of platelets to injured vascular surfaces in the arterial circulation, a critical initiating event in hemostasis. The main portion of the receptor is a heterodimer composed of 2 polypeptide chains, an alpha chain (GP1BA; MIM 606672) and a beta chain (GP1BB; MIM 138720), that are linked by disulfide bonds. The complete receptor complex includes noncovalent association of the alpha and beta subunits with platelet glycoprotein IX (GP9; MIM 173515) and GP5. Mutations in GP1BA, GP1BB, and GP9 have been shown to cause Bernard-Soulier syndrome (MIM 231200), a bleeding disorder.[supplied by OMIM]

== See also ==
- Cluster of differentiation
