= Platelet =

Component of blood aiding in coagulation

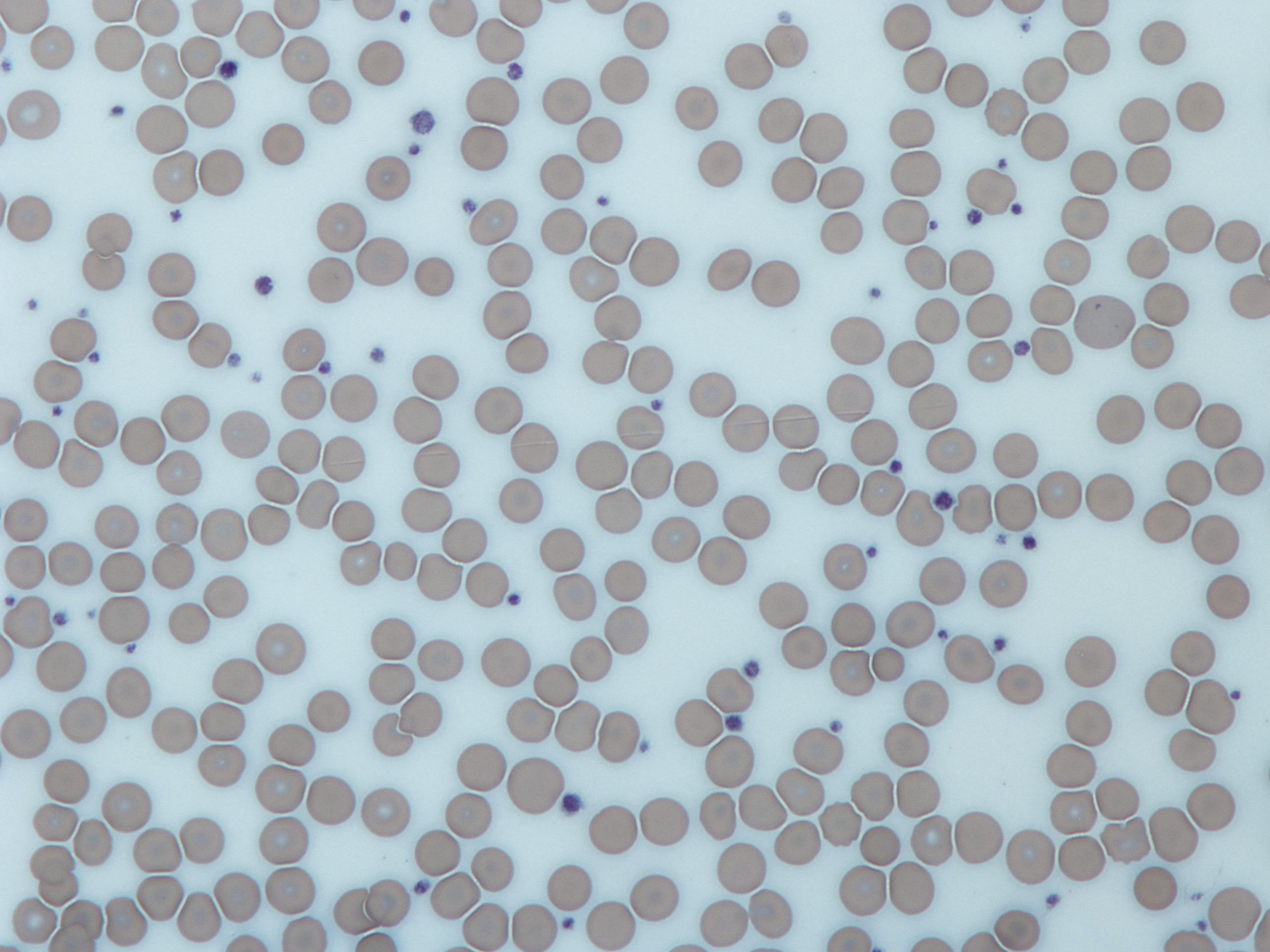
- Image from a light microscope (500 ×) from a Giemsa-stained peripheral blood smear showing platelets (small purple dots) surrounded by red blood cells (large gray circular structures)

Details
- Precursor: Megakaryocyte
- Function: Formation of blood clots; prevention of bleeding

Identifiers
- Latin: thrombocytus
- MeSH: D001792
- FMA: 62851

Platelets or thrombocytes (from Ancient Greek θρόμβος (thrómbos) 'clot' and κύτος (kútos) 'cell') are a part of blood whose function (along with the coagulation factors) is to react to bleeding from blood vessel injury by clumping to form a blood clot. Platelets have no cell nucleus; they are fragments of cytoplasm from megakaryocytes which reside in bone marrow or lung tissue, and then enter the circulation. Platelets are found only in mammals, whereas in other vertebrates (e.g. birds, amphibians), thrombocytes circulate as intact mononuclear cells.

The ligands, denoted by letter L, signal for platelets (P) to migrate towards the wound (Site A). As more platelets gather around the opening, they produce more ligands to amplify the response. The platelets congregate around the wound in order to create a cap to stop blood flow out of the tissue.

One major function of platelets is to contribute to hemostasis: the process of stopping bleeding at the site where the lining of vessels (endothelium) has been interrupted. Platelets gather at the site and, unless the interruption is physically too large, they plug it. First, platelets attach to substances outside the interrupted endothelium: adhesion. Second, they change shape, turn on receptors and secrete chemical messengers: activation. Third, they connect to each other through receptor bridges: aggregation. Formation of this platelet plug (primary hemostasis) is associated with activation of the coagulation cascade, with resultant fibrin deposition and linking (secondary hemostasis). These processes may overlap: the spectrum is from a predominantly platelet plug, or "white clot" to a predominantly fibrin, or "red clot" or the more typical mixture. Berridge adds retraction and platelet inhibition as fourth and fifth steps, while others would add a sixth step, wound repair. Platelets participate in both innate and adaptive intravascular immune responses.

In addition to facilitating the clotting process, platelets contain cytokines and growth factors which can promote wound healing and regeneration of damaged tissues.

== Term ==
The term thrombocyte (clot cell) came into use in the early 1900s and is sometimes used as a synonym for platelet; but not generally in the scientific literature, except as a root word for other terms related to platelets (e.g. thrombocytopenia meaning low platelets). The term thrombocytes is proper for mononuclear cells found in the blood of non-mammalian vertebrates: they are the functional equivalent of platelets, but circulate as intact cells rather than cytoplasmic fragments of bone marrow megakaryocytes.

In some contexts, the word thrombus is used interchangeably with the word clot, regardless of its composition (white, red, or mixed). In other contexts it is used to contrast a normal from an abnormal clot: thrombus arises from physiologic hemostasis, thrombosis arises from a pathologic and excessive quantity of clot. In a third context it is used to contrast the result from the process: thrombus is the result, thrombosis is the process.

== Structure ==
Structurally the platelet can be divided into four zones, from peripheral to innermost:

- Peripheral zone — rich in glycoproteins required for platelet adhesion, activation and aggregation. For example, GPIb/IX/V; GPVI; GPIIb/IIIa
- Sol-gel zone — rich in microtubules and microfilaments, allowing platelets to maintain a discoid shape
- Organelle zone — rich in platelet granules. Alpha granules contain clotting mediators such as factor V, factor VIII, fibrinogen, fibronectin, platelet-derived growth factor, and chemotactic agents. Delta granules, or dense bodies, contain ADP, calcium, and serotonin, which are platelet-activating mediators.
- Membranous zone — membranes derived from megakaryocyte smooth endoplasmic reticulum organized into a dense tubular system that is responsible for thromboxane A2 synthesis. This dense tubular system is connected to the surface platelet membrane to aid thromboxane A2 release.

=== Shape ===
Circulating inactivated platelets are biconvex discoid (lens-shaped) structures, 2–3 μm in greatest diameter. Activated platelets have cell membrane projections covering their surface.

In a first approximation, the shape can be considered similar to oblate spheroids, with a semiaxis ratio of 2 to 8. This approximation can be used to model the hydrodynamic and optical properties of a population, as well as to restore the geometric parameters of individual measured platelets by flow cytometry. More accurate biophysical models of platelet surface morphology that model its shape from first principles make it possible to obtain a more realistic platelet geometry in a calm and activated state.

=== Development ===
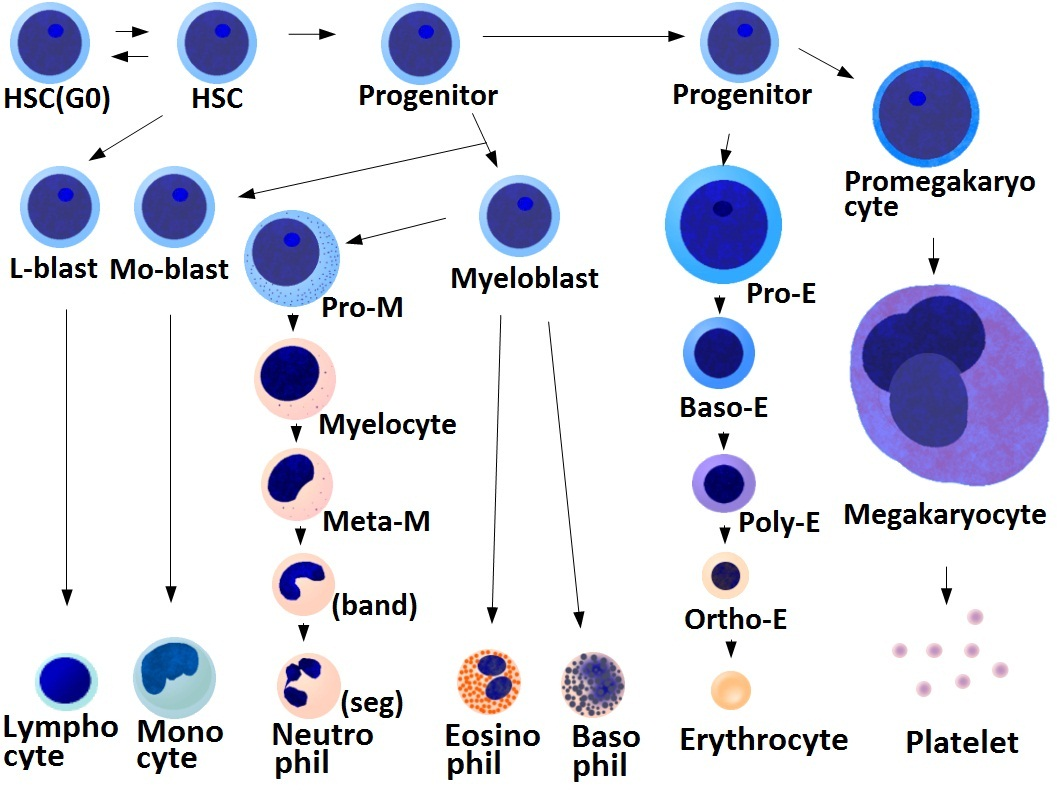
Platelets derive from multipotent marrow stem cells.

- Megakaryocyte and platelet production is regulated by thrombopoietin, a hormone produced in the kidneys and liver.
- Each megakaryocyte produces between 1,000 and 3,000 platelets during its lifetime.
- An average of 10^{11} platelets are produced daily in a healthy adult.
- Reserve platelets are stored in the spleen and are released when needed by splenic contraction induced by the sympathetic nervous system.

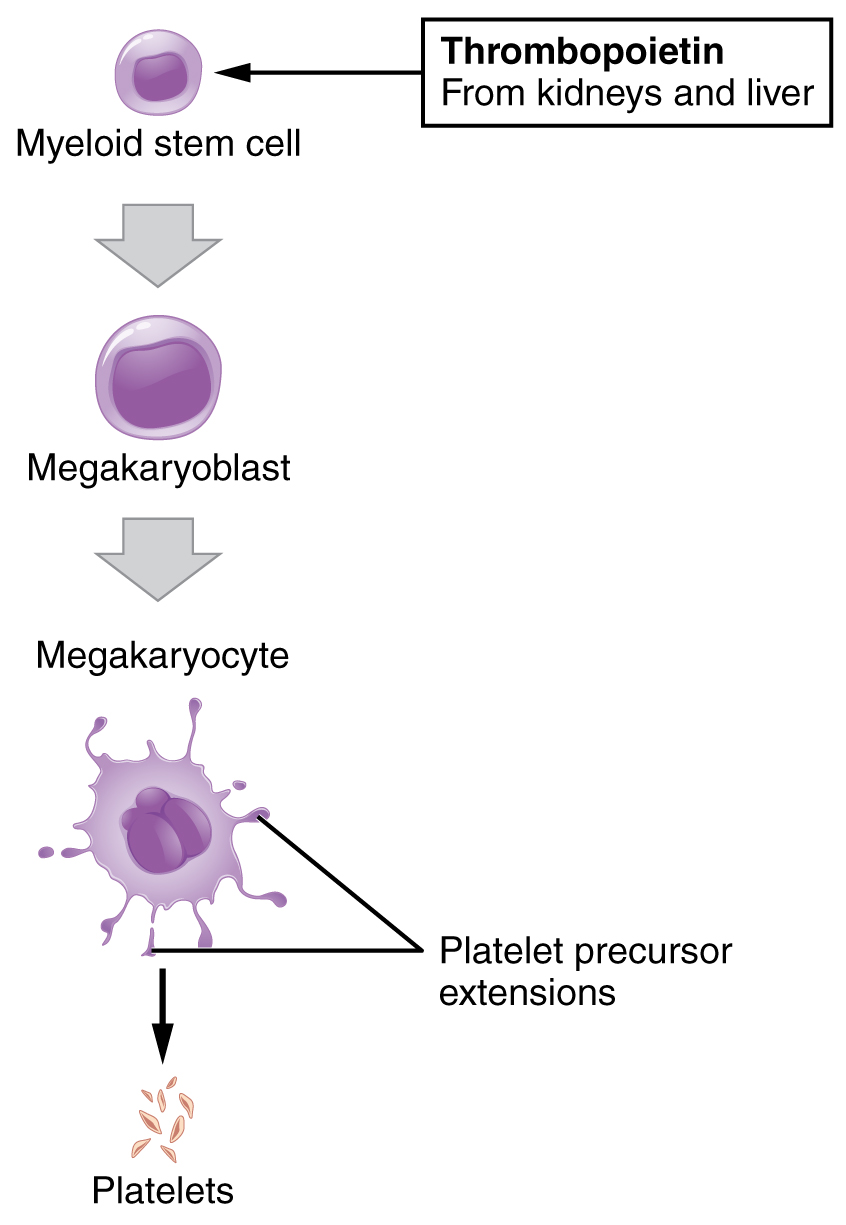
Platelets extruded from megakaryocytes

- The average life span of circulating platelets is 8 to 9 days. Life span of individual platelets is controlled by the internal apoptotic regulating pathway, which has a Bcl-x_{L} timer.
- Old platelets are destroyed by phagocytosis in the spleen and liver.

== Hemostasis ==
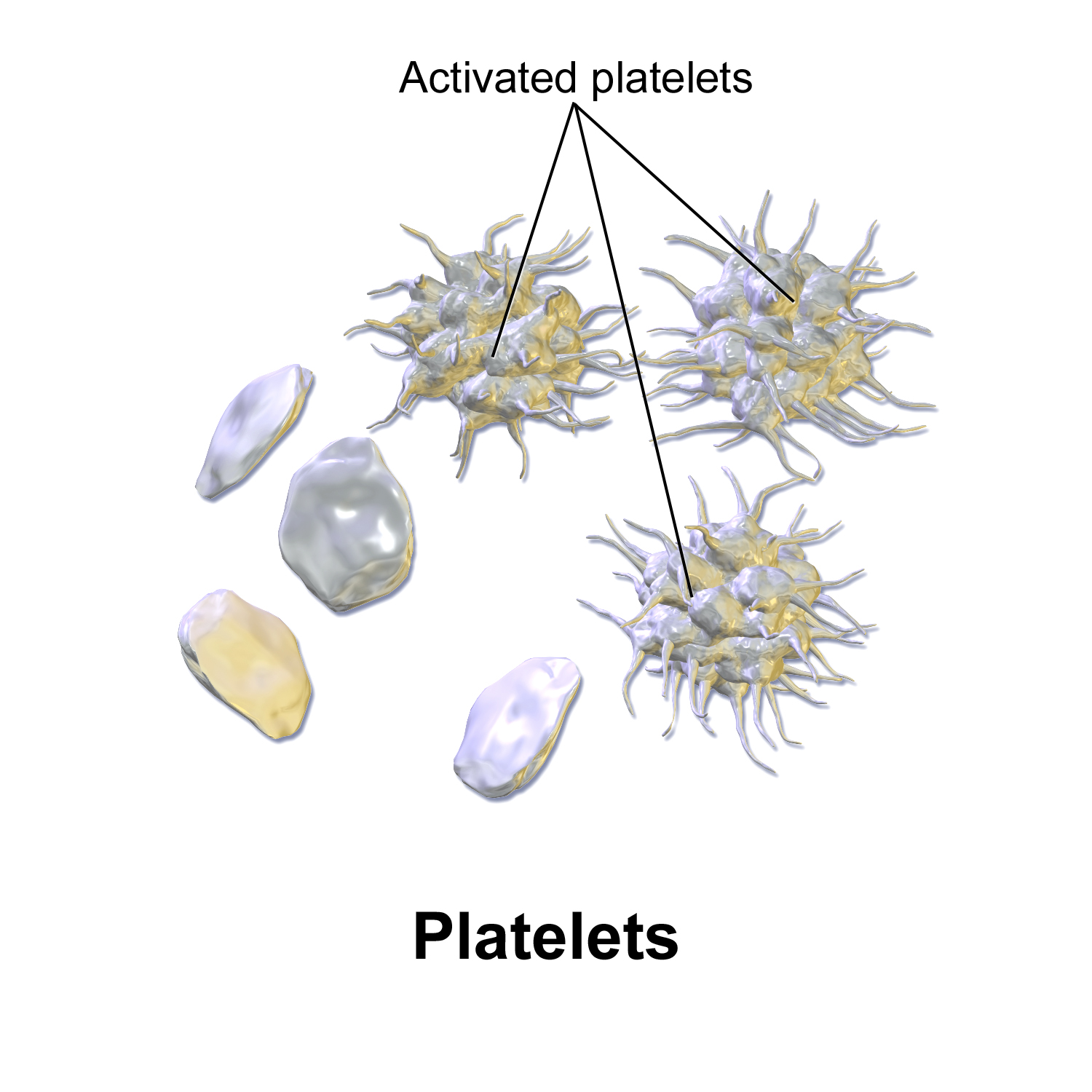
3D rendering of four inactivated and three activated platelets

The fundamental function of platelets is to clump together to stop acute bleeding. This process is complex, as more than 193 proteins and 301 interactions are involved in platelet dynamics. Despite much overlap, platelet function can be modeled in three steps:

=== Adhesion ===
Thrombus formation on an intact endothelium is prevented by nitric oxide, prostacyclin, and CD39.

Endothelial cells attach to the subendothelial collagen by von Willebrand factor (VWF), which these cells produce. VWF is also stored in the Weibel-Palade bodies of the endothelial cells and secreted constitutively into the blood. Platelets store vWF in their alpha granules.

When the endothelial layer is disrupted, collagen and VWF anchor platelets to the subendothelium. Platelet GP1b-IX-V receptor binds with VWF; and GPVI receptor and integrin α2β1 bind with collagen.

=== Activation ===
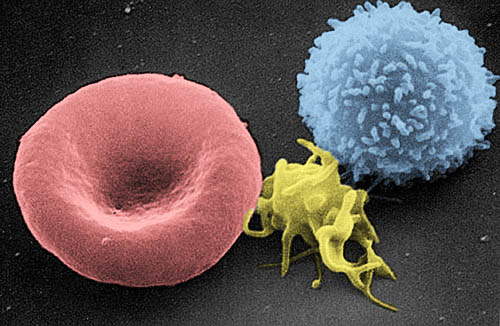
Scanning electron micrograph of blood cells. From left to right: human erythrocyte, activated platelet, leukocyte.

==== Inhibition ====
Factors from the lining of vessels stop platelets from activating. An intact endothelial lining inhibits platelet activation by producing nitric oxide, endothelial-ADPase, and PGI_{2} (prostacyclin). Endothelial-ADPase degrades the platelet activator ADP.

Resting platelets maintain active calcium efflux via a cyclic AMP-activated calcium pump. Intracellular calcium concentration determines platelet activation status, as it is the second messenger that drives platelet conformational change and degranulation. Endothelial prostacyclin binds to prostanoid receptors on the surface of resting platelets. This event stimulates the coupled Gs protein to increase adenylate cyclase activity and increases the production of cAMP, further promoting the efflux of calcium and reducing intracellular calcium availability for platelet activation.

ADP binds to purinergic receptors on the platelet surface. Since the thrombocytic purinergic receptor P2Y12 is coupled to Gi proteins, ADP reduces platelet adenylate cyclase activity and cAMP production, leading to accumulation of calcium inside the platelet by inactivating the cAMP calcium efflux pump. The other ADP-receptor P2Y1 couples to Gq that activates phospholipase C-beta 2 (PLCB2), resulting in inositol 1,4,5-trisphosphate (IP3) generation and intracellular release of more calcium. This together induces platelet activation. Endothelial ADPase degrades ADP and prevents this from happening. Clopidogrel and related antiplatelet medications also work as purinergic receptor P2Y12 antagonists. Data suggest that ADP activates the PI3K/Akt pathway during a first wave of aggregation, leading to thrombin generation and PAR‐1 activation, which evokes a second wave of aggregation.

==== Trigger (induction) ====
Platelet activation begins seconds after adhesion occurs. It is triggered when collagen from the subendothelium binds with its receptors (GPVI receptor and integrin α2β1) on the platelet. GPVI is associated with the Fc receptor gamma chain and leads via the activation of a tyrosine kinase cascade finally to the activation of PLC-gamma2 (PLCG2) and more calcium release.

Tissue factor also binds to factor VII in the blood, which initiates the extrinsic coagulation cascade to increase thrombin production. Thrombin is a potent platelet activator, acting through Gq and G12. These are G protein-coupled receptors and they turn on calcium-mediated signaling pathways within the platelet, overcoming the baseline calcium efflux. Families of three G proteins (Gq, Gi, G12) operate together for full activation. Thrombin also promotes secondary fibrin-reinforcement of the platelet plug. Platelet activation in turn degranulates and releases factor V and fibrinogen, potentiating the coagulation cascade. Platelet plugging and coagulation occur simultaneously, with each inducing the other to form the final fibrin-crosslinked thrombus.

==== Components (consequences) ====
===== GPIIb/IIIa activation =====
Collagen-mediated GPVI signalling increases the platelet production of thromboxane A2 (TXA2) and decreases the production of prostacyclin. This occurs by altering the metabolic flux of platelet's eicosanoid synthesis pathway, which involves enzymes phospholipase A2, cyclo-oxygenase 1, and thromboxane-A synthase. Platelets secrete thromboxane A2, which acts on the platelet's own thromboxane receptors on the platelet surface (hence the so-called "out-in" mechanism), and those of other platelets. These receptors trigger intraplatelet signaling, which converts GPIIb/IIIa receptors to their active form to initiate aggregation.

===== Granule secretion =====
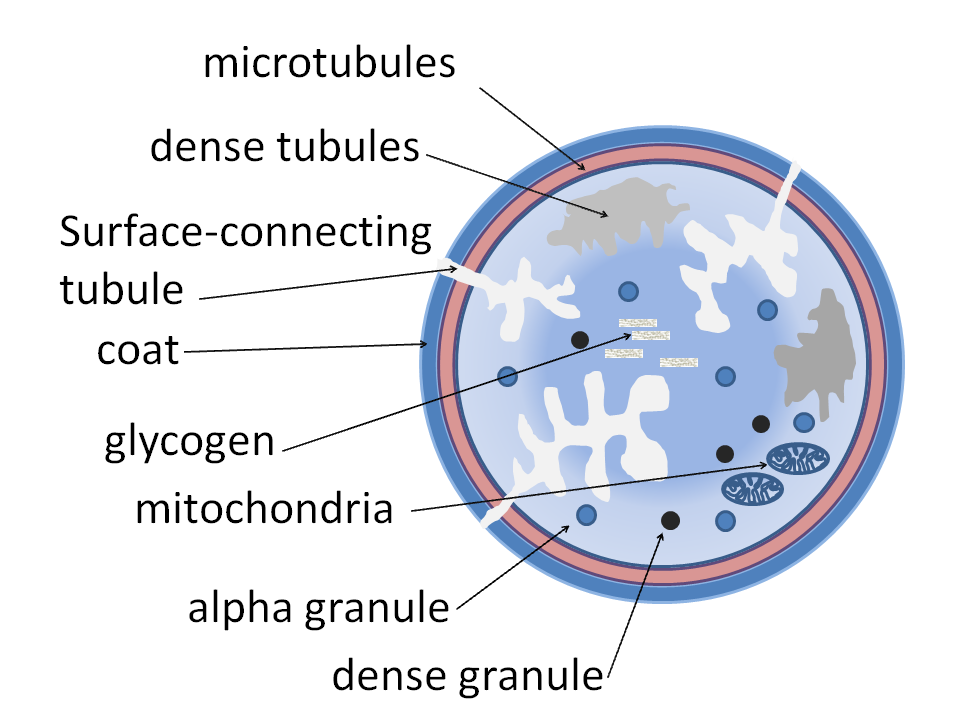
Diagram of the structure of a platelet showing the granules

Platelets contain dense granules, lambda granules, and alpha granules. Activated platelets secrete the contents of these granules through their canalicular systems to the exterior. Bound and activated platelets degranulate to release platelet chemotactic agents to attract more platelets to the site of endothelial injury. Granule characteristics:

- α granules (alpha granules) — containing P-selectin, platelet factor 4, transforming growth factor-β1, platelet-derived growth factor, fibronectin, B-thromboglobulin, vWF, fibrinogen, and coagulation factors V and XIII
- δ granules (delta or dense granules) — containing ADP or ATP, calcium, and serotonin
- γ granules (gamma granules) — similar to lysosomes and contain several hydrolytic enzymes
- λ granules (lambda granules) — contents involved in resorption during later stages of vessel repair

===== Morphology change =====
As shown by flow cytometry and electron microscopy, the most sensitive sign of activation, when exposed to platelets using ADP, are morphological changes. Mitochondrial hyperpolarization is a key event in initiating morphology changes. Intraplatelet calcium concentration increases, stimulating the interplay between the microtubule/actin filament complex. The continuous changes in shape from the unactivated to the fully activated platelet are best seen via scanning electron microscopy. The three steps along this path are named early dendritic, early spread, and spread. The surface of the unactivated platelet looks similar to the surface of the brain–a wrinkled appearance from numerous shallow folds that increase the surface area; early dendritic, an octopus with multiple arms and legs; early spread, an uncooked frying egg in a pan, the "yolk" is the central body; and the spread, a cooked fried egg with a denser central body.

These changes are all brought about by the interaction of the microtubule/actin complex with the platelet cell membrane and open canalicular system (OCS), which is an extension and invagination of that membrane. This complex runs just beneath these membranes and is the chemical motor that pulls the invaginated OCS out of the interior of the platelet, like turning pants pockets inside out, creating the dendrites. This process is similar to the mechanism of contraction in a muscle cell. The entire OCS thus becomes indistinguishable from the initial platelet membrane as it forms the "fried egg". This dramatic increase in surface area comes about with neither stretching nor adding phospholipids to the platelet membrane.

===== Platelet-coagulation factor interactions: coagulation facilitation =====
Platelet activation causes its membrane surface to become negatively charged. One of the signaling pathways turns on scramblase, which moves negatively charged phospholipids from the inner to the outer platelet membrane surface. These phospholipids then bind the tenase and prothrombinase complexes, two of the sites of interplay between platelets and the coagulation cascade. Calcium ions are essential for the binding of these coagulation factors.

In addition to interacting with vWF and fibrin, platelets interact with thrombin, Factors X, Va, VIIa, XI, IX, and prothrombin to complete formation via the coagulation cascade. Human platelets do not express tissue factor. Rat platelets do express tissue factor protein and carry both tissue factor pre-mRNA and mature mRNA.

=== Aggregation ===
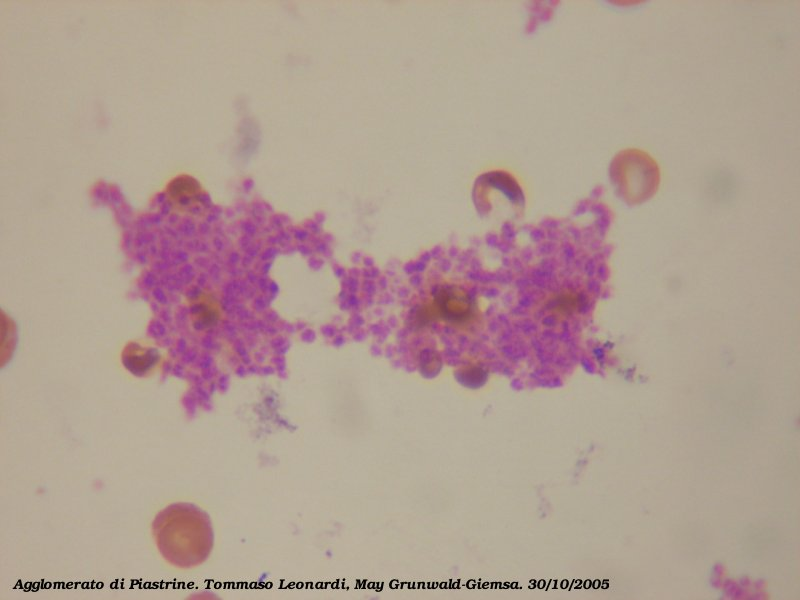
Platelet clumps in a blood smear

Platelet aggregation begins minutes after activation, and occurs as a result of turning on the GPIIb/IIIa receptor, allowing these receptors to bind with vWF or fibrinogen. Each platelet has around 60,000 of these receptors. When any one or more of at least nine different platelet surface receptors are turned on during activation, intraplatelet signaling pathways cause existing GpIIb/IIIa receptors to change shape — curled to straight — and thus become capable of binding.

Since fibrinogen is a rod-like protein with nodules on either end capable of binding GPIIb/IIIa, activated platelets with exposed GPIIb/IIIa can bind fibrinogen to aggregate. GPIIb/IIIa may also further anchor the platelets to subendothelial vWF for additional structural stabilisation.

Classically it was thought that this was the only mechanism involved in aggregation, but three other mechanisms have been identified which can initiate aggregation, depending on the velocity of blood flow (i.e. shear range).

== Immune function ==
Platelets have a central role in innate immunity, initiating and participating in multiple inflammatory processes, directly binding and even destroying pathogens. Clinical data show that many patients with serious bacterial or viral infections have thrombocytopenia, thus reducing their contribution to inflammation. Platelet-leukocyte aggregates (PLAs) found in circulation are typical in sepsis or inflammatory bowel disease, showing the connection between thrombocytes and immune cells.

The platelet cell membrane has receptors for collagen. Following rupture of the blood vessel wall, platelets are exposed and adhere to the collagen in the surrounding tissue.

=== Immunothrombosis ===
As hemostasis is a basic function of thrombocytes in mammals, it also has its uses in possible infection confinement. In case of injury, platelets, together with the coagulation cascade, provide the first line of defense by forming a blood clot. Hemostasis and host defense were thus intertwined in evolution. For example, in the Atlantic horseshoe crab (estimated to be over 400 million years old), the only blood cell type, the amebocyte, facilitates both the hemostatic function and immune functions, including encapsulation, phagocytosis of pathogens, and exocytosis of intracellular granules containing bactericidal defense molecules. Blood clotting supports immune function by trapping the bacteria.

Thrombosis (blood coagulation in intact blood vessels) is usually viewed as a pathological immune response, leading to obturation of lumen of blood vessel and subsequent hypoxic tissue damage. In some cases, however, directed thrombosis (or immunothrombosis) can locally control the spread of an infection. The thrombosis is directed in concordance with platelets, neutrophils and monocytes. The process is initiated either by immune cells by activating their pattern recognition receptors (PRRs), or by platelet-bacterial binding. Platelets can bind to bacteria either directly through thrombocytic PRRs and bacterial surface proteins, or via plasma proteins that bind both to platelets and bacteria. Monocytes respond to bacterial pathogen-associated molecular patterns (PAMPs), or damage-associated molecular patterns (DAMPs) by activating the extrinsic pathway of coagulation. Neutrophils facilitate the blood coagulation by NETosis, while platelets facilitate neutrophils' NETosis. NETs bind tissue factor, binding the coagulation centers to the location of infection. They also activate the intrinsic coagulation pathway by providing a negatively charged surface for factor XII. Other neutrophil secretions, such as proteolytic enzymes which cleave coagulation inhibitors, also bolster the process.

In case of imbalance in the regulation of immunothrombosis, this process can become aberrant. Regulatory defects in immunothrombosis are suspected to be a major factor in pathological thrombosis in forms such as disseminated intravascular coagulation (DIC) or deep vein thrombosis. DIC in sepsis is a prime example of both the dysregulated coagulation process and an undue systemic inflammatory response. It results in a multitude of microthrombi. These are similar in composition to the thrombi produced in native immunothrombosis — they are made up of fibrin, platelets, neutrophils and NETs.

=== Inflammation ===
Platelets rapidly deploy to sites of injury or infection. There, they are thought to modulate inflammatory processes via interactions with leukocytes and secretion of cytokines, chemokines, and other inflammatory mediators. Platelets also secrete platelet-derived growth factor (PDGF).

Platelets modulate neutrophils by forming platelet-leukocyte aggregates (PLAs). These formations induce upregulated production of the complement receptor αmβ2 (Mac-1) integrin in neutrophils. Interaction with PLAs also induces degranulation and increased phagocytosis in neutrophils.

Platelets are the largest source of soluble CD40L (CD154) which induces production of reactive oxygen species (ROS) and upregulates expression of adhesion molecules (such as E-selectin, ICAM-1, and VCAM-1) in neutrophils. CD40L also activates macrophages and activates cytotoxic response in T and B lymphocytes.

Mammalian platelets lacking nucleus are able to conduct autonomous locomotion. Platelets are active scavengers, scaling walls of blood vessels and reorganising the thrombus. They are able to recognize and adhere to many surfaces, including bacteria, and can envelop them in their open canalicular system (OCP), leading to a proposal to name the process as covercytosis (OCS) rather than phagocytosis, as OCS is merely an invagination of outer plasma membrane. These platelet-bacteria bundles provide an interaction platform for neutrophils that destroy bacteria using NETs and phagocytosis.

Platelets also participate in chronic inflammatory disease, such as synovitis or rheumatoid arthritis. Platelets are activated by collagen receptor glycoprotein IV (GPVI). Proinflammatory platelet microvesicles trigger constant cytokine secretion from neighboring fibroblast-like synoviocytes, most prominently Il-6 and Il-8. Inflammatory damage to the surrounding extracellular matrix continuously reveals more collagen, binding receptors on platelets and maintaining microvesicle production.

=== Adaptive immunity ===
Activated platelets are able to participate in adaptive immunity, interacting with antibodies. They are able to specifically bind IgG through FcγRIIA, a receptor for IgG's constant fragment (Fc). When activated and bound to IgG-opsonised bacteria, platelets release reactive oxygen species (ROS), antimicrobial peptides, defensins, kinocidins and proteases, killing the bacteria directly. Platelets also secrete proinflammatory and procoagulant mediators such as inorganic polyphosphates or platelet factor 4 (PF4), connecting innate and adaptive immune responses.

== Measurement and testing ==
=== Measurement ===
Platelet concentration in the blood (i.e. platelet count), can be measured manually using a hemocytometer, or by placing blood in an automated platelet analyzer using particle counting, such as a Coulter counter or optical methods. Most common blood testing methods include platelet count in their measurements, usually reported as PLT.

Platelet concentrations vary between individuals and over time, with the population average between 250,000 and 260,000 cells per mm^{3} (equivalent to per microliter), but the typical laboratory accepted normal range is between 150,000 and 400,000 cells per mm^{3} or 150–400 billion per liter.

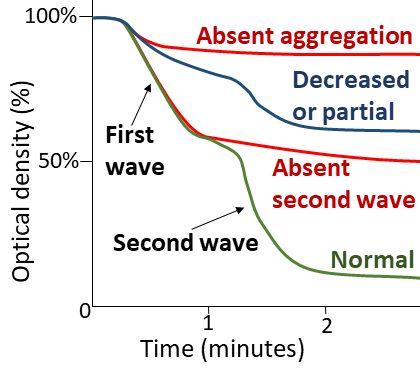
On for example optical densitometry, a first and second wave of platelet aggregation is seen, in this case for an ADP-initiated aggregation.

On a stained blood smear, platelets appear as dark purple spots, about 20% of the diameter of red blood cells. The smear reveals size, shape, qualitative number, and clumping. A healthy adult typically has 10 to 20 times more red blood cells than platelets.

=== Bleeding time ===
Bleeding time was developed as a test of platelet function by Duke in 1910. Duke's test measured the time taken for bleeding to stop from a standardized wound in the ear lobe that was blotted every 30 seconds, considering less than 3 minutes as normal. Bleeding time has low sensitivity and specificity for mild to moderate platelet disorders and is no longer recommended for screening.

=== Multiple electrode aggregometry ===
In multiple electrode aggregometry, anticoagulated whole blood is mixed with saline and a platelet agonist in a single-use cuvette with two pairs of electrodes. The increase in impedance between the electrodes as platelets aggregate onto them, is measured and visualized as a curve.

=== Light transmission aggregometry ===
In light transmission aggregometry (LTA), platelet-rich plasma is placed between a light source and a photocell. Unaggregated plasma allows relatively little light to pass through. After adding an agonist, the platelets aggregate, increasing light transmission, which is detected by a photocell.

=== Whole blood impedance aggregometry ===
Whole blood impedance aggregometry (WBA) measures the change in electrical impedance between two electrodes when platelet aggregation is induced by an agonist. Whole blood lumiaggregometry may increase the test sensitivity to impairment of platelet granule secretion.

=== PFA-100 ===
The PFA-100 (Platelet Function Assay — 100) is a system for analysing platelet function in which citrated whole blood is aspirated through a disposable cartridge containing an aperture within a membrane coated with either collagen and epinephrine or collagen and ADP. These agonists induce platelet adhesion, activation and aggregation, leading to rapid occlusion of the aperture and cessation of blood flow termed the closure time (CT). An elevated CT with EPI and collagen can indicate intrinsic defects such as von Willebrand disease, uremia, or circulating platelet inhibitors. A follow-up test involving collagen and ADP is used to indicate if the abnormal CT with collagen and EPI was caused by the effects of acetyl sulfosalicylic acid (aspirin) or medications containing inhibitors. The PFA-100 is highly sensitive to von Willebrand disease, but is only moderately sensitive to defects in platelet function.

== Clinical significance ==
Spontaneous and excessive bleeding can occur because of platelet disorders. This bleeding can be caused by deficient numbers of platelets, dysfunctional platelets, or platelet densities over 1 million/microliter. (The excessive numbers create a relative von Willebrand factor deficiency due to sequestration.)

Bleeding due to a platelet disorder or a coagulation factor disorder can be distinguished by the characteristics and location of the bleeding. Platelet bleeding involves bleeding from a cut that is prompt and excessive, but can be controlled by pressure; spontaneous bleeding into the skin which causes a purplish stain named by its size: petechiae, purpura, ecchymoses; bleeding into mucous membranes causing bleeding gums, nose bleed, and gastrointestinal bleeding; menorrhagia; and intraretinal and intracranial bleeding.

Excessive numbers of platelets, and/or normal platelets responding to abnormal vessel walls, can result in venous thrombosis and arterial thrombosis. The symptoms depend on the thrombosis site.

== Disorders ==
Platelet disorders can occur because there are not enough platelets, too many platelets, or the platelets do not function properly.

Low platelet concentration is called thrombocytopenia, and is due to either decreased production, increased destruction of platelets, or platelets being sequestered in another part of the body. Elevated platelet concentration is called thrombocytosis, and is either congenital, reactive (to cytokines), or due to unregulated production: one of the myeloproliferative neoplasms or certain other myeloid neoplasms.

Normal platelets can respond to an abnormality on the vessel wall rather than to hemorrhage, resulting in inappropriate platelet adhesion/activation and thrombosis: the formation of a clot within an intact vessel. This type of thrombosis arises by mechanisms different from those of a normal clot: extending the fibrin of venous thrombosis; extending an unstable or ruptured arterial plaque, causing arterial thrombosis; and microcirculatory thrombosis. An arterial thrombus may partially obstruct blood flow, causing downstream ischemia, or may completely obstruct it, causing downstream tissue death.:

Platelet aggregation function by disorders and agonists
	ADP	Epinephrine	Collagen	Ristocetin
P2Y receptor defect (including Clopidogrel)	Decreased	Normal	Normal	Normal
Adrenergic receptor defect	Normal	Decreased	Normal	Normal
Collagen receptor defect	Normal	Normal	Decreased or absent	Normal
Von Willebrand disease (except Type 2B); Bernard–Soulier syndrome	Normal	Normal	Normal	Decreased or absent
Glanzmann's thrombasthenia; Afibrinogenemia	Decreased	Decreased	Decreased	Normal or decreased
Storage pool deficiency	Absent second wave			Partial
Aspirin or aspirin-like disorder	Absent second wave		Absent	Normal

=== Thrombocytopenia ===
- Immune thrombocytopenia (ITP) — formerly known as immune thrombocytopenic purpura and idiopathic thrombocytopenic purpura
- Splenomegaly
  - Gaucher's disease
- Familial thrombocytopenia
- Chemotherapy
- Babesiosis
- Dengue fever
- Onyalai
- Thrombotic thrombocytopenic purpura
- HELLP syndrome
- Hemolytic–uremic syndrome
- Drug-induced thrombocytopenic purpura (five known drugs — most problematic is heparin-induced thrombocytopenia (HIT)
- Pregnancy-associated
- Neonatal alloimmune associated
- Aplastic anemia
- Transfusion-associated
- Pseudothrombocytopenia
- Vaccine-induced immune thrombotic thrombocytopenia (VITT)

=== Altered platelet function ===
- Congenital
  - Disorders of adhesion
    - Bernard–Soulier syndrome
  - Disorders of activation
    - Disorders of granule amount or release
    - Hermansky–Pudlak syndrome
    - Gray platelet syndrome
    - ADP receptor defect
    - Decreased cyclooxygenase activity
    - Platelet storage pool deficiency
  - Disorders of aggregation
    - Glanzmann's thrombasthenia
    - Wiskott–Aldrich syndrome
  - Disorders of coagulant activity
    - COAT platelet defect
    - Scott syndrome
- Acquired
  - Disorders of adhesion
    - Paroxysmal nocturnal hemoglobinuria
    - Asthma
    - Aspirin-exacerbated respiratory disease (AERD/Samter's triad)
    - Cancer
    - Malaria
    - Decreased cyclooxygenase activity

=== Thrombocytosis and thrombocythemia ===
- Reactive
  - Chronic infection
  - Chronic inflammation
  - Malignancy
  - Hyposplenism (post-splenectomy)
  - Iron deficiency
  - Acute blood loss
- Myeloproliferative neoplasms — platelets are both elevated and activated
  - Essential thrombocythemia
  - Polycythemia vera
- Associated with other myeloid neoplasms
- Congenital

== Pharmacology ==
=== Anti-inflammatory drugs ===
Some drugs used to treat inflammation have the unwanted side effect of suppressing normal platelet function. These are the non-steroidal anti-inflammatory drugs (NSAIDS). Aspirin irreversibly disrupts platelet function by inhibiting cyclooxygenase-1 (COX1), and hence normal hemostasis. The resulting platelets are unable to produce new cyclooxygenase because they have no DNA. Normal platelet function does not return until the use of aspirin has ceased and enough of the affected platelets have been replaced by new ones, which can take over a week. Ibuprofen, another NSAID, does not have such a long duration effect, with platelet function usually returning within 24 hours, and taking ibuprofen before aspirin prevents the irreversible effects of aspirin.

=== Drugs that suppress platelet function ===
These drugs are used to prevent thrombus formation.

==== Oral agents ====
- Aspirin
- Cilostazol
- Clopidogrel
- Prasugrel
- Ticagrelor
- Ticlopidine

==== Intravenous agents ====
- Abciximab
- Eptifibatide
- Tirofiban
- Argatroban

=== Drugs that stimulate platelet production ===
- Desmopressin
- Factor VIIa
- Thrombopoietin mimetics
- Oprelvekin
- Romiplostim
- Eltrombopag

== Therapies ==
=== Transfusion ===
==== Indications ====
Platelet transfusion is most frequently used to correct unusually low platelet counts, either to prevent spontaneous bleeding (typically at counts below 10 billion/L) or in anticipation of medical procedures that necessarily involve some bleeding. For example, in patients undergoing surgery, a level below 50 billion/L is associated with abnormal surgical bleeding, and regional anaesthetic procedures such as epidurals are avoided for levels below 80 billion/L. Platelets may also be transfused when the platelet count is normal but the platelets are dysfunctional, such as when an individual is taking aspirin or clopidogrel. Finally, platelets may be transfused as part of a massive transfusion protocol, in which the three major blood components (red blood cells, plasma, and platelets) are transfused to address severe hemorrhage. Platelet transfusion is contraindicated in thrombotic thrombocytopenic purpura (TTP), as it fuels the coagulopathy. Platelet transfusion is generally ineffective, and thus contraindicated, for prophylaxis in immune thrombocytopenia (ITP), because the transfused platelets are immediately cleared; however, it is indicated to treat bleeding.

==== Collection ====
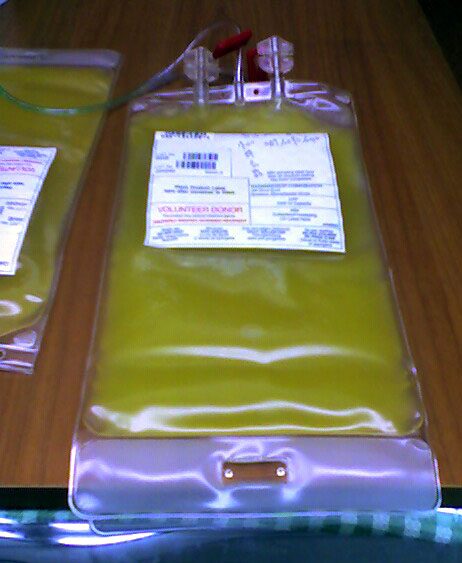
Platelet concentrate

Platelets are either isolated from collected units of whole blood and pooled to make a therapeutic dose, or collected by platelet apheresis: blood is taken from the donor, passed through a device which removes the platelets, and the remainder is returned to the donor in a closed loop. The industry standard is for platelets to be tested for bacteria before transfusion to avoid septic reactions, which can be fatal. Recently the AABB Industry Standards for Blood Banks and Transfusion Services (5.1.5.1) has allowed use of pathogen reduction technology as an alternative to bacterial screenings in platelets.

Pooled whole-blood platelets, sometimes called "random" platelets, are separated by one of two methods. In the US, a unit of whole blood is placed into a large centrifuge in what is referred to as a "soft spin". At these settings, the platelets remain suspended in the plasma. The platelet-rich plasma (PRP) is removed from the red cells, then centrifuged at a faster setting to harvest the platelets from the plasma. In other regions of the world, the unit of whole blood is centrifuged using settings that cause the platelets to become suspended in the "buffy coat" layer, which includes the platelets and the white blood cells. The "buffy coat" is isolated in a sterile bag, suspended in a small amount of red blood cells and plasma, then centrifuged again to separate the platelets and plasma from the red and white blood cells. Regardless of the initial method of preparation, multiple donations may be combined into one container using a sterile connection device to manufacture a single product with the desired therapeutic dose.

Apheresis platelets are collected using a mechanical device that draws blood from the donor and centrifuges the collected blood to separate out the platelets and other components to be collected. The remaining blood is returned to the donor. The advantage to this method is that a single donation provides at least one therapeutic dose, as opposed to the multiple donations for whole-blood platelets. This means that a recipient is exposed to fewer donors and has less risk of transfusion-transmitted disease and other complications. Sometimes a person such as a cancer patient who requires routine transfusions of platelets receives repeated donations from a specific donor to minimize risk. Pathogen reduction of platelets using for example, riboflavin and UV light treatments can reduce the infectious load of pathogens contained in donated blood products. Another photochemical treatment process utilizing amotosalen and UVA light has been developed for the inactivation of viruses, bacteria, parasites, and leukocytes. In addition, apheresis platelets tend to contain fewer contaminating red blood cells because the collection method is more efficient than "soft spin" centrifugation.

==== Storage ====
Platelets collected by either method have a typical shelf life of five days. This results in supply shortages, as testing donations often requires up to a full day. No effective preservative solutions have been devised for platelets.

Platelets are stored under constant agitation at 20–24 °C (68–75 °F). Units cannot be refrigerated as this causes platelets to change shape and lose function. Storage at room temperature provides an environment where any introduced bacteria may proliferate and subsequently cause bacteremia. The United States requires products to be tested for the presence of bacterial contamination before transfusion.

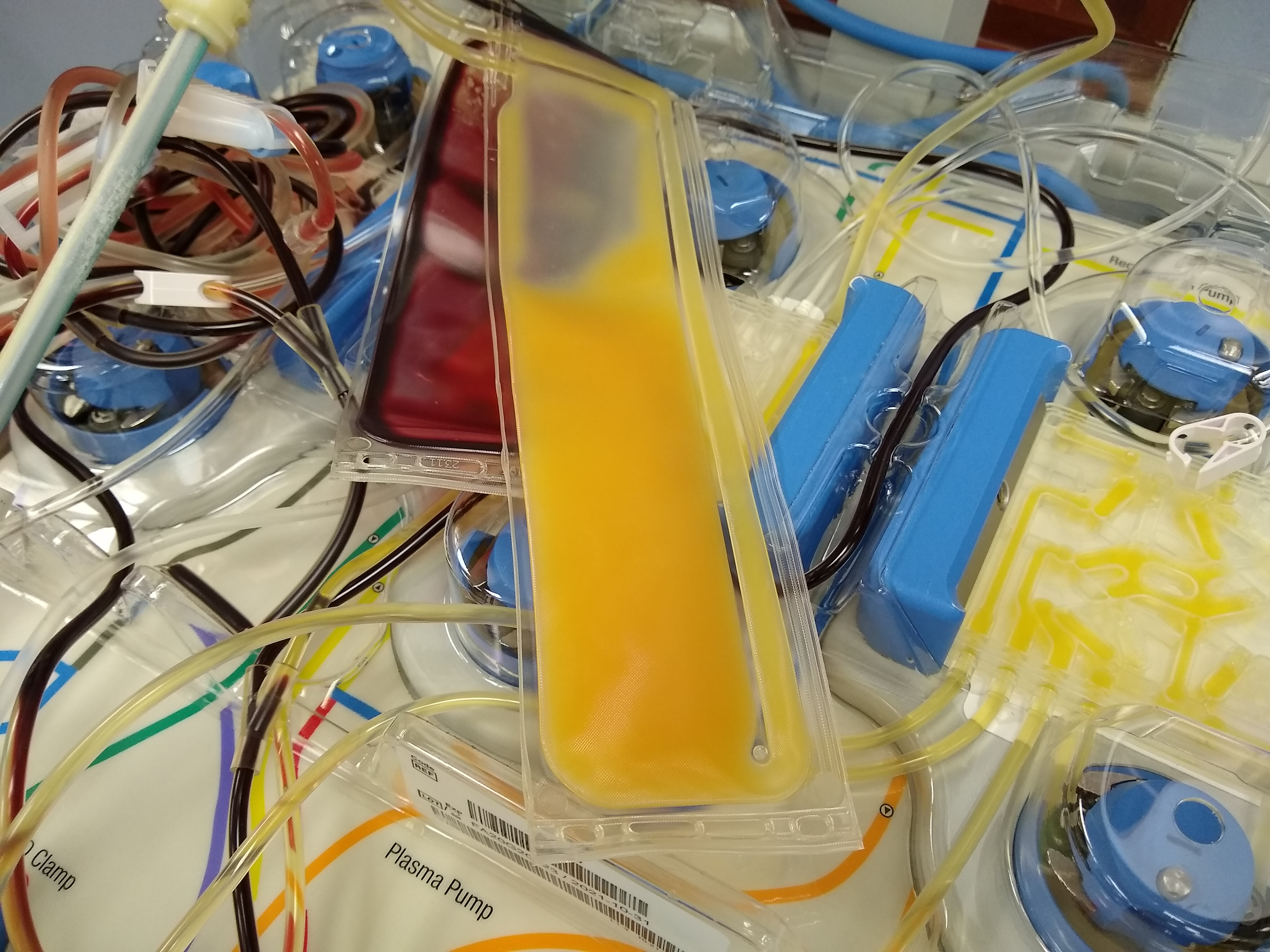
Platelets collected by using apheresis at an American Red Cross donation center

===== Cryopreserved platelets =====
Cryopreserved platelets are platelet components frozen for long-term storage, typically using dimethyl sulfoxide as a cryoprotectant. They have been investigated as an alternative to conventional liquid-stored platelets, which have a short shelf life of approximately 5 to 7 days. The longer shelf life of cryopreserved platelets may be useful in settings where maintaining liquid-stored platelets is difficult. A CLIP-II randomized clinical trial found that cryopreserved platelets did not meet the criterion for noninferiority compared with liquid-stored platelets for bleeding control in cardiac surgery, although no increase in prespecified adverse events was observed. A trial-based economic evaluation alongside CLIP-II found that cryopreserved platelets were more costly and less effective than liquid-stored platelets for treating active bleeding in patients undergoing cardiac surgery in tertiary Australian hospitals.

==== Transfusion ====
Platelets do not need to belong to the same A-B-O blood group as the recipient or be cross-matched to ensure immune compatibility between donor and recipient unless they contain a significant amount of red blood cells (RBCs). The presence of RBCs imparts a reddish-orange color to the product and is usually associated with whole-blood platelets. Some sites may type platelets, but this is not critical.

Prior to issuing platelets to the recipient, they may be irradiated to prevent transfusion-associated graft versus host disease or they may be washed to remove the plasma.

The change in the recipient's platelet count after transfusion is termed the "increment" and is calculated by subtracting the pre-transfusion platelet count from the post-transfusion count. Many factors affect the increment including body size, the number of platelets transfused, and clinical features that may cause premature destruction of the transfused platelets. When recipients fail to demonstrate an adequate post-transfusion increment, this is termed platelet transfusion refractoriness.

Platelets, either apheresis-derived or random-donor, can be processed through a volume reduction process. In this process, the platelets are spun in a centrifuge and plasma is removed, leaving 10 to 100 mL of platelet concentrate. Such volume-reduced platelets are normally transfused only to neonatal and pediatric patients when a large volume of plasma could overload the child's small circulatory system. The lower volume of plasma also reduces the chances of an adverse transfusion reaction to plasma proteins. Volume reduced platelets have a shelf life of four hours.

=== Wound repair ===
The blood clot is only a temporary solution to stop bleeding; tissue repair is needed. Small interruptions in the endothelium are handled by physiological mechanisms; large interruptions by a trauma surgeon. The fibrin is slowly dissolved by the fibrinolytic enzyme, plasmin, and the platelets are cleared by phagocytosis.

Platelets release platelet-derived growth factor (PDGF), a potent chemotactic agent; and TGF beta, which stimulates the deposition of extracellular matrix; fibroblast growth factor, insulin-like growth factor 1, platelet-derived epidermal growth factor, and vascular endothelial growth factor. Local application of these factors in increased concentrations through platelet-rich plasma (PRP) is used as an adjunct in wound healing.

== Non-mammals ==
Instead of platelets, non-mammalian vertebrates have nucleated thrombocytes, which resemble B lymphocytes in morphology. They aggregate in response to thrombin, but not to ADP, serotonin, nor adrenaline, as platelets do.

== History ==
- George Gulliver in 1841 drew pictures of platelets using the twin lens (compound) microscope invented in 1830 by Joseph Jackson Lister. This microscope improved resolution sufficiently to make it possible to see platelets for the first time.
- William Addison in 1842 drew pictures of a platelet-fibrin clot.
- Lionel Beale in 1864 was the first to publish a drawing showing platelets.
- Max Schultze in 1865 described what he called "spherules", which he noted were much smaller than red blood cells, occasionally clumped, and were sometimes found in collections of fibrin material.
- Giulio Bizzozero in 1882 studied the blood of amphibians microscopically in vivo. He named Schultze's spherules (It.) piastrine: little plates. Bizzozero possibly proposed the name Blutplattchen.
- William Osler observed platelets and, in published lectures in 1886, called them a third corpuscle and a blood plaque; and described them as "a colorless protoplasmic disc".
- James Wright examined blood smears using the stain named for him, and used the term plates in his 1906 publication, changing to platelets in his 1910 publication.

== See also ==
- List of distinct cell types in the adult human body
- Platelet-mimicking particle
