= Phosphatidylserine =

Chemical compound

- Components of phosphatidylserines: Blue, green: variable fatty acid groups Black: glycerol Red: phosphate Purple: serine

Identifiers
CAS Number	1446756-47-3
ChEBI	CHEBI:18303
ChemSpider	none
DrugBank	DB00144
KEGG	C02737
UNII	394XK0IH40
- Except where otherwise noted, data are given for materials in their standard state (at 25 °C [77 °F], 100 kPa). verify (what is ?) Infobox references

Phosphatidylserine (abbreviated Ptd-L-Ser or PS) is a phospholipid and a component of the cell membrane. It plays a key role in cell cycle signaling, specifically in connection with apoptosis. It is a key pathway for viruses to enter cells via apoptotic mimicry. Its exposure on the outer surface of a cell membrane marks the cell for destruction via apoptosis.

== Structure ==
Phosphatidylserine is a phospholipid—more specifically a glycerophospholipid—which consists of two fatty acids attached in ester linkage to the first and second carbon of glycerol and serine attached through a phosphodiester linkage to the third carbon of the glycerol.

Phosphatidylserine sourced from plants differs in fatty acid composition from that sourced from animals. It is commonly found in the inner (cytoplasmic) leaflet of biological membranes. It is almost entirely found in the inner monolayer of the membrane with only less than 10% of it in the outer monolayer.

== Biosynthesis ==
Phosphatidylserine (PS) is the major acidic phospholipid class that accounts for 13–15% of the phospholipids in the human cerebral cortex. In the plasma membrane, PS is localized exclusively in the cytoplasmic leaflet where it forms part of protein docking sites necessary for the activation of several key signaling pathways. These include the Akt, protein kinase C (PKC) and Raf-1 signaling that is known to stimulate neuronal survival, neurite growth, and synaptogenesis. Modulation of the PS level in the plasma membrane of neurons has a significant impact on these signaling processes.

== Composition ==
Biosynthesis of phosphatidylserine

Phosphatidylserine is formed in bacteria (such as E. coli) through a displacement of cytidine monophosphate (CMP) through a nucleophilic attack by the hydroxyl functional group of serine. CMP is formed from CDP-diacylglycerol by PS synthase. Phosphatidylserine can eventually become phosphatidylethanolamine by the enzyme PS decarboxylase (forming carbon dioxide as a byproduct). Similar to bacteria, yeast can form phosphatidylserine in an identical pathway.

In mammals, phosphatidylserine is instead derived from phosphatidylethanolamine or phosphatidylcholine through one of two Ca^{2+}-dependent head-group exchange reactions in the endoplasmic reticulum. Both reactions require a serine but produce an ethanolamine or choline, respectively. These are promoted by phosphatidylserine synthase 1 (PSS1) or 2 (PSS2). Conversely, phosphatidylserine can also give rise to phosphatidylethanolamine and phosphatidylcholine, although in animals the pathway to generate phosphatidylcholine from phosphatidylserine only operates in the liver.

== Functions ==
=== Cognitive function ===
Supplementation with PS has been studied with mixed results; while some short-term research (such as a 2001 trial on soy-derived PS with measurements at 6 and 12 weeks) found no significant effect on cognitive performance in the elderly with age-associated memory impairment, the U.S. FDA has permitted qualified health claims (with enforcement discretion) stating that phosphatidylserine may reduce the risk of dementia and cognitive dysfunction in the elderly, though noting the evidence is very limited and preliminary.

=== Apoptosis ===
PS plays a crucial role in the process of apoptosis (programmed cell death). During apoptosis, PS translocates from the inner leaflet of the cell membrane to the outer leaflet, serving as a signal for phagocytic cells to engulf the dying cell.

== Dietary sources ==
The average daily phosphatidylserine intake in a Western diet is estimated to be 130 mg. Phosphatidylserine may be found in meat and fish. Only small amounts are found in dairy products and vegetables, with the exception of white beans and soy lecithin. Phosphatidylserine is found in soy lecithin at about 3% of total phospholipids.

Table 1. Phosphatidylserine content in different foods.

Food	Content in mg/100 g
Soy lecithin	1,650
Bovine brain	700-800
Beef liver	713
Salmon	480-550
Atlantic mackerel	480
Atlantic herring	360
Eel	335
Offal (average value)	305
Chicken heart	150-414
Pig's spleen	239
Pig's kidney	218
Tuna	194
Chicken leg, with skin, without bone	134
Chicken liver	123
White beans	107
Soft-shell clam	87
Chicken breast, with skin	85
Mullet	76
Veal	72
Beef	69
Egg yolk	60-70
Pork	57
Pig's liver	50
Turkey leg, without skin or bone	50
Turkey breast without skin	45
Crayfish	40
Cuttlefish	31
Atlantic cod	28
Anchovy	25
Whole grain barley	20
European hake	17
European pilchard (sardine)	16
Trout	14
Rice (unpolished)	3
Carrot	2
Ewe's Milk	2
Cow's Milk (whole, 3.5% fat)	1
Potato	1

== Supplementation ==
=== Health claims ===
A panel of the European Food Safety Authority concluded that a cause and effect relationship cannot be established between the consumption of phosphatidylserine and "memory and cognitive functioning in the elderly", "mental health/cognitive function" and "stress reduction and enhanced memory function". This conclusion follows because bovine brain cortex- and soy-based phosphatidylserine are different substances and might, therefore, have different biological activities. Therefore, the results of studies using phosphatidylserine from different sources cannot be generalized.

==== Cognition ====
In May, 2003 the Food and Drug Administration gave "qualified health claim" status to phosphatidylserine thus allowing labels to state "consumption of phosphatidylserine may reduce the risk of dementia and cognitive dysfunction in the elderly" along with the disclaimer "very limited and preliminary scientific research suggests that phosphatidylserine may reduce the risk of cognitive dysfunction in the elderly." According to the FDA, there is a lack of scientific agreement amongst qualified experts that a relationship exists between phosphatidylserine and cognitive function.

More recent reviews have suggested that the relationship may be more robust, though the mechanism remains unclear. A 2020 review of three clinical trials found that phosphatidylserine is likely effective for enhancing cognitive function in older people with mild cognitive impairment. Some studies have suggested that whether the phosphatidylserine is plant- or animal-derived may have significance, with the FDA's statement applying specifically to soy-derived products.

=== Safety ===
Initially, phosphatidylserine supplements were derived from bovine cortex. However, due to the risk of potential transfer of infectious diseases such as bovine spongiform encephalopathy (or "mad cow disease"), soy-derived supplements became an alternative. A 2002 safety report determined supplementation in elderly people at a dosage of 200 mg three times daily to be safe. Some manufacturers of phosphatidylserine use sunflower lecithin instead of soy lecithin as a source of raw material production.
