= Katherine A. High =

American doctor

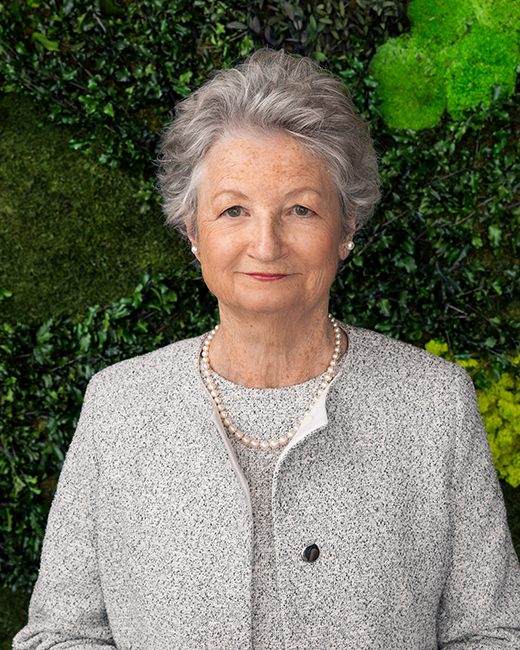
- High in 2026
- Born: High Point, North Carolina
- Education: Harvard College, University of North Carolina School of Medicine
- Known for: Gene Therapy
- Children: three, including Sarah Steele
- Scientific career
- Fields: Hematology
- Workplaces: University of Pennsylvania, Spark Therapeutics
- Academic advisors: Edward J. Benz Jr.

Katherine A. High is an American physician-scientist who is an emeritus professor at the Perelman School of Medicine at the University of Pennsylvania. She was the co-founder, president, and chief scientific officer of Spark Therapeutics and is CEO of the ophthalmology gene therapy company RhyGaze. She has been recognized for her contributions to the field of gene therapy, having designed, sponsored, and conducted the first clinical trial of an adeno-associated viral vector (AAV) gene therapy injected into the skeletal muscle (1999), the first trial of AAV gene therapy introduced into the liver (2001), and the first trial in the US of an AAV gene therapy injected into the subretinal space (2007). She was among the first to elucidate human immune responses to systemically administered AAV vectors, and developed solutions that are used in clinical gene therapy. High is an elected member of the National Academy of Medicine, the National Academy of Sciences, the American Academy of Arts and Sciences, and the Royal College of Physicians.

== Education ==
High received an A.B. in chemistry at Harvard University in 1972. She started her medical training at the University of North Carolina (UNC) School of Medicine, during which she took a leave of absence to work in a chemistry research lab at UNC. After returning and completing her medical degree in 1978, High continued with a residency in internal medicine. She then became a hematology fellow at Yale University under the supervision of Edward J Benz Jr, during which she worked on the molecular genetics of globin genes and oncogenes.

== Career and research ==
=== Research on hemophilia gene therapy ===
High was a faculty member at the University of North Carolina - Chapel Hill for seven years, where she started her career by cloning the normal canine Factor IX gene and then characterizing the mutation in a naturally occurring canine model of hemophilia B, to enable gene therapy studies for the disease in a canine model. She also identified several mutations responsible for human hemophilia B, as well as Factor VII, and Factor X-deficient blood clotting disorders. High moved to the University of Pennsylvania and Children's Hospital of Philadelphia, where she began pioneering clinical trials of gene therapy for blood disorders. During her career at the University of Pennsylvania, High expanded her research into gene therapy solutions for hereditary blindness together with Dr. Jean Bennett.

She was the director of the Center for Cellular and Molecular Therapeutics, and beginning in 2001, head of hematology research, at the Children's Hospital of Philadelphia, where she was also an investigator of the Howard Hughes Medical Institute.

=== Spark Therapeutics ===
From 2014 to 2020, High was the co-founder, President, Chief Scientific Officer/Head of R&D and a Member of the Board of Directors of Spark Therapeutics, a fully integrated, commercial gene therapy company in Philadelphia. While at Spark Therapeutics, Dr. High led the team that obtained the first FDA approval of an AAV therapeutic (Voretigene neparvovec for the treatment of an inherited disorder causing blindness) in December 2017 and led the teams that obtained Breakthrough Therapy designation and FDA approval for Fidanacogene elaparvovec to treat Hemophilia B and Breakthrough Therapy designation for Dirloctogene samoparvovec to treat Hemophilia A.

Spark Therapeutics was bought by Swiss pharma company Roche in December 2019 for $4.3 billion. In February 2020, High stepped down from her position at the company.

=== Post-Spark Therapeutics ===
In January 2021, High joined Asklepios Biopharmaceutical, or AskBio, a clinical-stage adeno-associated virus (AAV) gene therapy company and wholly owned subsidiary of Bayer AG, as the company's new President of Therapeutics and as a board member for AskBio. In 2024 she became Chief Executive Officer of the genetic medicine company RhyGaze.

=== Other activities ===
High has been on NIH study sections for hematology and for therapeutic approaches to genetic disease. She was on the National Heart, Lung and Blood Advisory Council, on the NIH Clinical Center Advisory Council, and on the Board of Scientific Counsellors for the National Eye Institute. She did a four year term on the FDA Advisory Committee on Cell, Tissue and Gene Therapy (2001–2005) and was the President of the American Society of Gene and Cell Therapy (2004–2005).

== Awards ==
- 2000 – National Bleeding Disorders Foundation, Researcher of the Year award
- 2009 – Foundation Fighting Blindness, Board of Directors Award
- 2010 – American Society of Gene and Cell Therapy, Outstanding Achievement Award
- 2014 – Human Gene Therapy, Pioneer Award
- 2018 – Sanford Health's $1 million Lorraine Cross Award for innovation in medicine and science, shared with Jean Bennett
- 2022 – American Society of Gene and Cell Therapy, Jerry Mendell Award for Translational Science
- 2022 – Children's Hospital of Philadelphia, Gold Medal for transformative impact on children's health through gene therapy
- 2026 – Breakthrough Prize in Life Sciences

== Personal life ==
High is married to George Steele, an internist who was on the faculty of the University of Pennsylvania School of Medicine. She has three children, one of whom is actress Sarah Steele.
