= Spark Therapeutics =

American pharmaceutical company

Spark Therapeutics, Inc.
- Type: Subsidiary of Hoffmann-La Roche
- Industry: Biotechnology; Pharmaceutical
- Founded: 2013; 13 years ago
- Founders: Katherine A. High; Jeffrey Marrazzo; Jean Bennett; J Fraser Wright; Beverly Davidson; Jennifer Wellman
- Headquarters: Philadelphia, Pennsylvania
- Revenue: ▲$64 million (2018)
- Net income: ▲ -$78 million (2018)
- Total assets: ▲$814 million (2018)
- Total equity: ▼$496 million (2018)
- Number of employees: 368 (2019)
- Parent: Hoffmann-La Roche
- Website: sparktx.com

Spark Therapeutics, Inc. was a developer of gene therapy treatments, which treat debilitating genetic diseases. It was founded in 2013 and has been a subsidiary of Hoffmann-La Roche since 2020.

== History ==
The company was founded in 2013 by Katherine A. High, Jeffrey Marrazzo, and Steven Altschuler in an effort to commercially develop treatments against haemophilia that High was working on at Children's Hospital of Philadelphia.

In January 2015, the company became a public company, trading under the ticker $ONCE via a $161 million initial public offering led by Chief Legal Officer Joseph La Barge.

In December 2017, the U.S. Food and Drug Administration approved Luxturna (voretigene neparvovec-rzyl) for the treatment of patients with viable retinal cells and confirmed biallelic RPE65 mutation-associated retinal dystrophy, a genetic blinding condition caused by mutations in the RPE65 gene. The company is currently developing several gene therapies to target a suite of diseases, including Haemophilia A and B, and several central nervous system diseases.

In December 2019, the company was acquired by Hoffmann-La Roche for $4.3 billion. It now continues to operate as an independent subsidiary. Since the acquisition by Swiss pharma Roche, several key founding executives have departed, including scientist and co-founder Katherine High in February 2020, Chief Business/Legal Officer Joseph La Barge in December 2021, and co-founder and Chief Executive Officer Jeffrey Marrazzo in April 2022

On February 23, 2022, Marrazzo named big-Pharma veteran Ron Philip as his successor. Mr. Philip currently leads the organization.

== Products and pipeline ==
=== Voretigene neparvovec ===
Voretigene neparvovec, marketed under the tradename Luxturna, is a gene therapy approved by the Food and Drug Administration for treatment of Leber's congenital amaurosis, a rare genetic eye disease.

=== Fidanacogene elaparvovec ===
Fidanacogene elaparvovec, previously known by its study ID number SPK-9001, is a gene therapy for the treatment of hemophilia B. It was developed by Spark in partnership with Pfizer. Fidanacogene elaparvovec is an adeno-associated viral vector which is designed to transfer a working copy of the Factor IX gene into the livers of patients who carry non-functioning copies. It received FDA approval in 2024.

=== SPK-8011 ===
SPK-8011 (Dirloctogene samoparvovec) is an experimental drug under investigation for treatment of Haemophilia A. It is entering phase III clinical trials in the United States. The therapy transfers a working copy of the Factor VIII gene into patients who lack one. In Phase II clinical trials, 2 of 7 patients receiving the highest dose of the drug suffered immune responses. One patient had to be hospitalized. The reactions against the treatment were seen as a set-back, though Spark suggested that the responses could be controlled with steroids, and promised to move forward with Phase III testing.

=== SPK-7001 ===
SPK-7001 is an experimental drug under investigation for treatment of choroideremia, a genetic disorder that causes blindness.

=== SPK-3006 ===
SPK-3006 is an experimental drug under investigation for treatment of Pompe disease, a genetic disorder that leads to failure to correctly metabolize glycogen.

=== SPK-1001 ===
SPK-1001 is an experimental drug under investigation for treatment of Batten disease, a fatal genetic nervous system disorder.
