= Alfredo Pavlovsky =

Alfredo Pavlovsky (24 November 1907 – 26 April 1984) was an Argentinian physician who discovered that haemophilia has two types (A and B). Pavlovsky graduated with his medical degree in 1931, then worked as Bernardo Houssay's assistant professor in physiology. In 1947 he reported in Buenos Aires that "occasionally (in vitro) the blood of some of the haemophilic patients with a greatly prolonged clotting time ... when added to other haemophilic blood possessed a coagulant action nearly as effective as normal blood". This was later shown to be due to the blood of people with haemophilia B providing the clotting factor VIII to correct the defect in those with the more common haemophilia A.

Pavlovsky had five children and died in 1984.
