= UniQure =

Dutch biopharmaceutical company

uniQure
- Type: Public
- Traded as: Nasdaq: QURE
- Industry: Pharmaceutical; Medical Technology
- Founded: 1998
- Headquarters: Amsterdam, Netherlands
- Website: uniqure.com

uniQure is a Dutch biopharmaceutical company which makes gene therapies. It has developed several adeno-associated virus gene therapies.

== History ==
In 2012 uniQuire won approval for alipogene tiparvovec (trade name Glybera) for treatment of lipoprotein lipase deficiency. The drug came off the market in 2017 due to limited demand largely blamed on its over US$1 million cost.

In 2022, the US Food and Drug Administration (FDA) granted approval to uniQure's etranacogene dezaparvovec (trade name Hemgenix) for treatment of haemophilia B. The drug was the fifth gene therapy for a rare genetic disease to ever win approval. uniQure partnered with CSL Behring to commercialize Hemgenix.

In late 2025, the FDA reversed an earlier decision to grant breakthrough status to uniQure's investigational drug for Huntington's disease, AMT-130. The FDA's rejection was reversed in June 2026.
