= MK-2060 =

MK-2060 is an experimental monoclonal antibody and factor XI inhibitor in development as an antithrombosis agent.
