= Dirloctogene samoparvovec =

Experimental gene therapy

Dirloctocogene samoparvovec, also known as SPK-8011, is an experimental gene therapy developed for hemophilia A by Roche and Spark Therapeutics. It uses an engineered AAV vector to cause liver cells to produce the Factor VIII blood clotting protein.
