= Efanesoctocog alfa =

Medication

Clinical data
- Trade names: Altuviiio, Altuvoct
- Other names: BIVV001; antihemophilic factor (recombinant), Fc-VWF-XTEN fusion protein-ehtl
- License data: US DailyMed: Altuviiio
- Routes of administration: Intravenous
- ATC code: None

Legal status
- Legal status: CA: ℞-only; US: ℞-only; EU: Rx-only

Identifiers
- CAS Number: 2252477-42-0
- DrugBank: DB16662
- UNII: WH7BHQ0RB4
- KEGG: D12441

Chemical and physical data
- Formula: C_{13690}H_{20958}N_{3682}O_{4376}S_{136}
- Molar mass: 311501.81 g·mol^{−1}

Efanesoctocog alfa, sold under the brand name Altuviiio, is a medication used for the treatment of hemophilia A (congenital factor VIII deficiency).

Efanesoctocog alfa was approved for medical use in the United States in February 2023.

== Medical uses ==
Efanesoctocog alfa is a recombinant DNA-derived, Factor VIII concentrate indicated for use in adults and children with hemophilia A (congenital factor VIII deficiency) for routine prophylaxis to reduce the frequency of bleeding episodes; on-demand treatment & control of bleeding episodes; and perioperative management of bleeding.

== Society and culture ==
=== Legal status ===
In April 2024, the Committee for Medicinal Products for Human Use of the European Medicines Agency adopted a positive opinion, recommending the granting of a marketing authorization for the medicinal product Altuvoct, intended for the prevention and treatment of bleeding in people with hemophilia A caused by factor VIII deficiency. The applicant for this medicinal product is Swedish Orphan Biovitrum. Altuvoct was approved for medical use in the European Union in June 2024.
