= Edward Tuddenham =

Edward G. D. Tuddenham
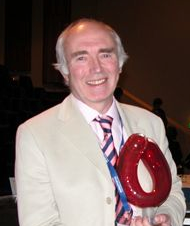
- Born: 1944 (age 81–82)
- Citizenship: British
- Education: University of London
- Known for: Purification and cloning of factor VIII, gene therapy for haemophilia
- Awards: Fellowship of the Academy of Medical Sciences, Barry Firkin Award 2006, Henri Chaigneau Award 2012
- Scientific career
- Fields: haematology
- Workplaces: University College London, Royal Free Hospital

Edward G. D. Tuddenham is a British haematologist who has authored over 200 papers in the field. He gained his Bachelor of Medicine, Bachelor of Surgery at the University of London in 1968 and his Membership of the Royal College of Physicians in 1975. Up until 2005 was head of the Haemostasis and Thrombosis Research (Medical Research Council) Group at Imperial College. Professor Tuddenham is a pioneer in the field of haemophilia and was responsible, along with Frances Rotblat, for the purification and cloning of the factor VIII gene, which led to the highly effective and safe treatments available to haemophilia sufferers today. In more recent years, he has been actively involved in developing gene therapy for haemophilia. The first successful use of gene transfer to convert severe to mild haemophilia B was reported by his group in December 2011.He retired from Directorship of the Katharine Dormandy Centre in July 2011 and is now Emeritus Professor of Haemophilia at University College London. He continues to work in the Haemophilia Centre at the Royal Free Hospital on gene therapy clinical trials, with the goal of curing all forms of haemophilia.
