= Activated blood coagulation factor XI =

Activated blood coagulation factor XI may refer to:

- Coagulation factor IXa, an enzyme
- Coagulation factor XIa, an enzyme
