= ASC618 =

Experimental gene therapy

ASC618 (also known as AAV2/8 HCB-ET3-LCO BDD FVIII) is an experimental gene therapy for Hemophilia A. It was developed by Applied StemCell Therapeutics and is delivered via a hybrid of adeno-associated virus types 2 and 8. The gene therapy is hoped to be more effective than earlier gene therapies for hemophilia A.
