= Frances Rotblat =

British haematologist (1946–2021)

- Born: 27 July 1946; London, England
- Died: 22 April 2021
- Education: St Bartholomew's Hospital Medical College
- Occupation: Haematologist

Frances Rotblat was a British haematologist and scientist whose work contributed to major advances in the understanding and treatment of haemophilia. She is known for her research on blood coagulation and for developing techniques, including the use of monoclonal antibodies, to purify clotting factor VIII.

Her work on the purification and characterisation of factor VIII formed part of the scientific developments that enabled the sequencing of the factor VIII gene and the subsequent production of recombinant clotting factors. In this context, she has been described in tributes as a pioneering figure in the early development of biotechnology applied to haemophilia treatment.

Rotblat later worked in regulatory science at the Medicines Control Agency, contributing to the oversight of medicines in the United Kingdom.

== Life ==
Frances Rotblat was born in London in 1946 to Mania and Michael Rotblat, Jewish refugees who had escaped the Warsaw Ghetto. Joseph Rotblat, a nuclear physicist and disarmament campaigner, was her uncle.

Rotblat attended the South Hampstead High School, and graduated from St Bartholomew's Hospital Medical College in physiology, medicine and surgery. She later obtained fellowships in pharmacology and haematology.

She died on 22 April 2021 from complications of diabetes.

== Work ==
In 1979, Rotblat began work with Edward Tuddenham at the Royal Free Hospital in North London to isolate and stabilise the so-called Factor 8, a protein which haemophiliacs had a shortage of, leading to their blood not clotting. They extracted Factor 8 from cryoprecipitate, a plasma protein that was used at the time to inhibit bleeding, and after several stages of chemistry, used diisopropyl fluorophosphate, a nerve gas, to prevent enzymes from destroying the Factor 8. Rotblat and Tuddenham's innovation was to inject mice with the Factor 8 to cause the development of antibodies, which then were extracted from the mouse spleen, and concentrated into a pure sample of Factor 8. This was sent to Genentech, an American biotechnology company, for DNA sequencing, which was completed in 1984.

According to a later account by Edward Tuddenham, Victor Hoffbrand, then head of haematology at the Royal Free Hospital, remarked to her: “Frances, if this succeeds, you are going to be rich and famous.” Rotblat replied: “No, David Heath will be rich. Ted will be famous, and I’ll be out of work.”

Following the successful development of recombinant factor VIII in the mid-1980s, this exchange has been cited as reflecting concerns about recognition and career progression in the scientific community. When funding for her work on haemophilia was stopped, Rotblat joined the UK Medicines Control Authority, vetting blood medications and vaccines before approval, where she remained till retirement.

Following the mad cow disease outbreak in the UK in the 1990s, most likely caused by consumption of tainted British beef, regulators were concerned that vaccines made from serums of British cows had been used in the population. Although by 1991 most vaccine manufacturers had switched to material from New Zealand cows (where the bovine disease had never occurred), there were still about 500,000 litres of British-origin material used in the manufacture of several vaccines. In 1999, Rotblat was asked by a Health department inquiry to investigate the issue, and she informed the inquiry that the theoretical risk of contamination was determined to be outweighed by the benefits of vaccination, and therefore the material was permitted to be used.

== Involvement in UK blood product safety ==
Rotblat’s work intersected with issues later central to the UK infected blood scandal through her research and regulatory roles in haemophilia and blood product safety. Prior to joining the Medicines Control Agency, she conducted research on haemophilia and clotting factor concentrates. Evidence submitted to the Infected Blood Inquiry indicates that she was involved in professional correspondence concerning blood safety testing, including discussions on alanine aminotransferase (ALT) testing of blood donations in the late 1980s. While she was not identified as a central decision-maker, these records place her among clinicians and regulators engaged with the safety and testing of blood products during the period in which contaminated factor concentrates led to widespread infections.

== Selected publications ==
- G. Vehar; B. Keyt; D. Eaton; H. Rodriguez; D. P. O'Brien; Frances Rotblat; et al. (1984). "Structure of human factor VIII". Nature. 312 (5992): 337–342. Bibcode:1984Natur.312..337V. doi:10.1038/312337a0. PMID 6438527. S2CID 4358605.
- Frances Rotblat; D. P. O'Brien; F. J. O'Brien; A. H. Goodall; E. G. D. Tuddenham (1985). "Purification of human factor VIII:C and its characterization by Western blotting using monoclonal antibodies". Biochemistry. 24 (16): 4294–4300. doi:10.1021/bi00337a007. PMID 2413885.
- T. Takase; Frances Rotblat; A. H. Goodall; P. B. A. Kernoff; S. Middleton; S. Chand; K. W. Denson; D. E. G. Austen; E. G. D. Tuddenham (1987). "Production of factor VIII deficient plasma by immunodepletion using three monoclonal antibodies". British Journal of Haematology. 66 (4): 497–502. doi:10.1111/j.1365-2141.1987.tb01334.x. PMID 3117089. S2CID 45210895.
