= Milvexian =

Chemical compound

Clinical data
- Other names: BMS-986177, JNJ-70033093
- Routes of administration: By mouth
- ATC code: None

Legal status
- Legal status: Investigational

Pharmacokinetic data
- Elimination half-life: 11.4–18.1 h

Identifiers
- IUPAC name: (9R,13S)-13-{4-[5-Chloro-2-(4-chloro-1H-1,2,3-triazol-1-yl)phenyl]-6-oxo-1(6H)-pyrimidinyl}-3-(difluoromethyl)-9-methyl-3,4,7,15-tetraazatricyclo[12.3.1.0^{2,6}]octadeca-1(18),2(6),4,14,16-pentaen-8-one
- CAS Number: 1802425-99-5
- PubChem CID: 118277544
- DrugBank: DB16233
- ChemSpider: 76803905
- UNII: 0W79NDQ608
- KEGG: D11802
- ChEMBL: ChEMBL4112929

Chemical and physical data
- Formula: C_{28}H_{23}Cl_{2}F_{2}N_{9}O_{2}
- Molar mass: 626.45 g·mol^{−1}
- 3D model (JSmol): Interactive image
- SMILES: C[C@@H]1CCC[C@H](n2cnc(-c3cc(Cl)ccc3-n3cc(Cl)nn3)cc2=O)c2cc(ccn2)-c2c(cnn2C(F)F)NC1=O
- InChI: InChI=1S/C28H23Cl2F2N9O2/c1-15-3-2-4-23(20-9-16(7-8-33-20)26-21(36-27(15)43)12-35-41(26)28(31)32)39-14-34-19(11-25(39)42)18-10-17(29)5-6-22(18)40-13-24(30)37-38-40/h5-15,23,28H,2-4H2,1H3,(H,36,43)/t15-,23+/m1/s1; Key:FSWFYCYPTDLKON-CMJOXMDJSA-N

Milvexian is a factor XIa inhibitor anticoagulant drug. It is taken by mouth. As of late 2021, it was under study for the prevention of blood clots in patients undergoing surgery. In 2018–2023, Bristol-Myers Squibb studied milvexian for the prevention of stroke.
