= Haemophilia C =

Hemophilia C
- Other names: Plasma thromboplastin antecedent (PTA) deficiency, Rosenthal syndrome
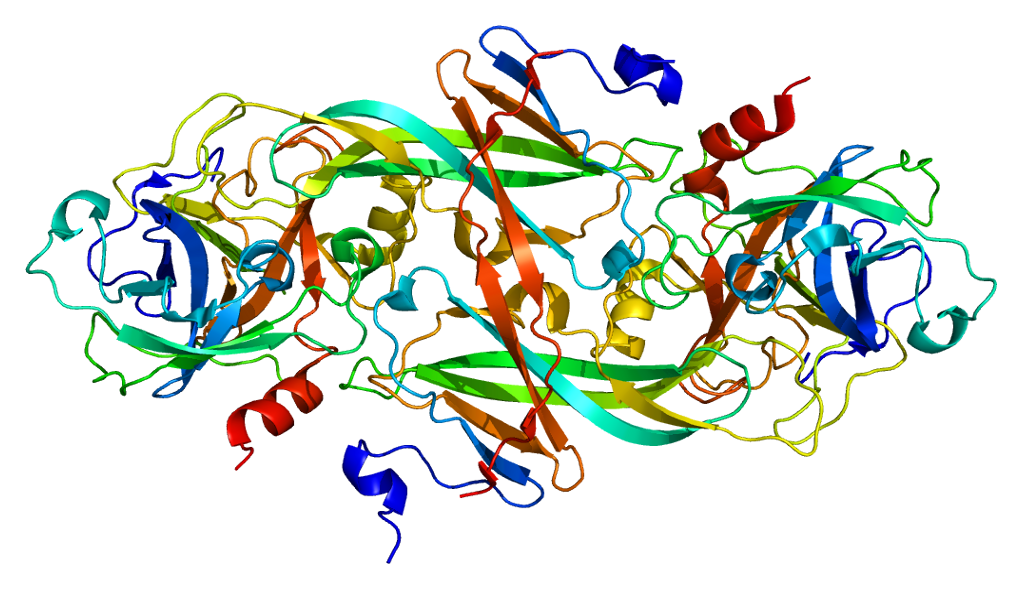
- Haemophilia C caused by deficiency in Factor XI
- Specialty: Haematology
- Symptoms: Oral bleeding
- Causes: Deficiency of coagulation factor XI
- Diagnostic method: Prothrombin time
- Prevention: Physical activity precautions
- Treatment: tranexamic acid

Haemophilia C (also known as plasma thromboplastin antecedent (PTA) deficiency or Rosenthal syndrome) is a mild form of haemophilia affecting both sexes, due to factor XI deficiency. It predominantly occurs in Ashkenazi Jews. It is the fourth most common inborn bleeding disorder after von Willebrand's disease and haemophilia A and B. In the United States, it is thought to affect 1 in 100,000 of the adult population, making it 10% as common as haemophilia A.

== Signs and symptoms ==
In terms of the signs/symptoms of haemophilia C, unlike individuals with Haemophilia A and B, people affected by it are not ones to bleed spontaneously. In these cases, haemorrhages tend to happen after a major surgery or injury. However, people affected with haemophilia C might experience symptoms closely related to those of other forms of haemophilia such as the following:

- Oral bleeding.
- Nosebleeds
- Blood in the urine
- Post-partum bleeding (20% of cases)
- Tonsils (bleeding)

== Cause ==
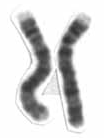
Chromosome 4

Haemophilia C is caused by a deficiency of coagulation factor XI and is distinguished from haemophilia A and B by the fact it does not lead to bleeding into the joints. Because factor XI helps sustain the fibrin clot in the intrinsic clotting pathway and combat fibrinolysis, a deficiency in this factor contributes to abnormal bleeding patterns; however, the amount of excessive bleeding is variable among those with haemophilia C. Furthermore, it has autosomal recessive inheritance since the gene for factor XI is located on chromosome 4 (near the prekallikrein gene); and it is not completely recessive, individuals who are heterozygous also show increased bleeding.

Many mutations exist, and the bleeding risk is not always influenced by the severity of the deficiency. Haemophilia C is occasionally observed in individuals with systemic lupus erythematosus, because of inhibitors to the FXI protein.

== Diagnosis ==
The diagnosis of haemophilia C (factor XI deficiency) is centered on prolonged activated partial thromboplastin time (aPTT). One will find that the factor XI has decreased in the individual's body. In terms of differential diagnosis, one must consider: haemophilia A, haemophilia B, lupus anticoagulant and heparin contamination. The prolongation of the activated partial thromboplastin time should completely correct with a 1:1 mixing study with normal plasma if haemophilia C is present; in contrast, if a lupus anticoagulant is present as the cause of a prolonged aPTT, the aPTT will not correct with a 1:1 mixing study.

== Treatment ==
In terms of haemophilia C medication tranexamic acid is often used for both treatment after an incident of bleeding and as a preventive measure to avoid excessive bleeding during oral surgery.

Treatment is usually unnecessary, except in relation to operations, leading to many of those having the condition not being aware of it. In these cases, fresh frozen plasma or recombinant factor XI may be used, but only if necessary.

Those affected may often develop nosebleeds, while females can experience unusual menstrual bleeding which can be avoided by taking birth control such as: IUDs and oral or injected contraceptives to increase coagulation ability by adjusting hormones to levels similar to pregnancy.

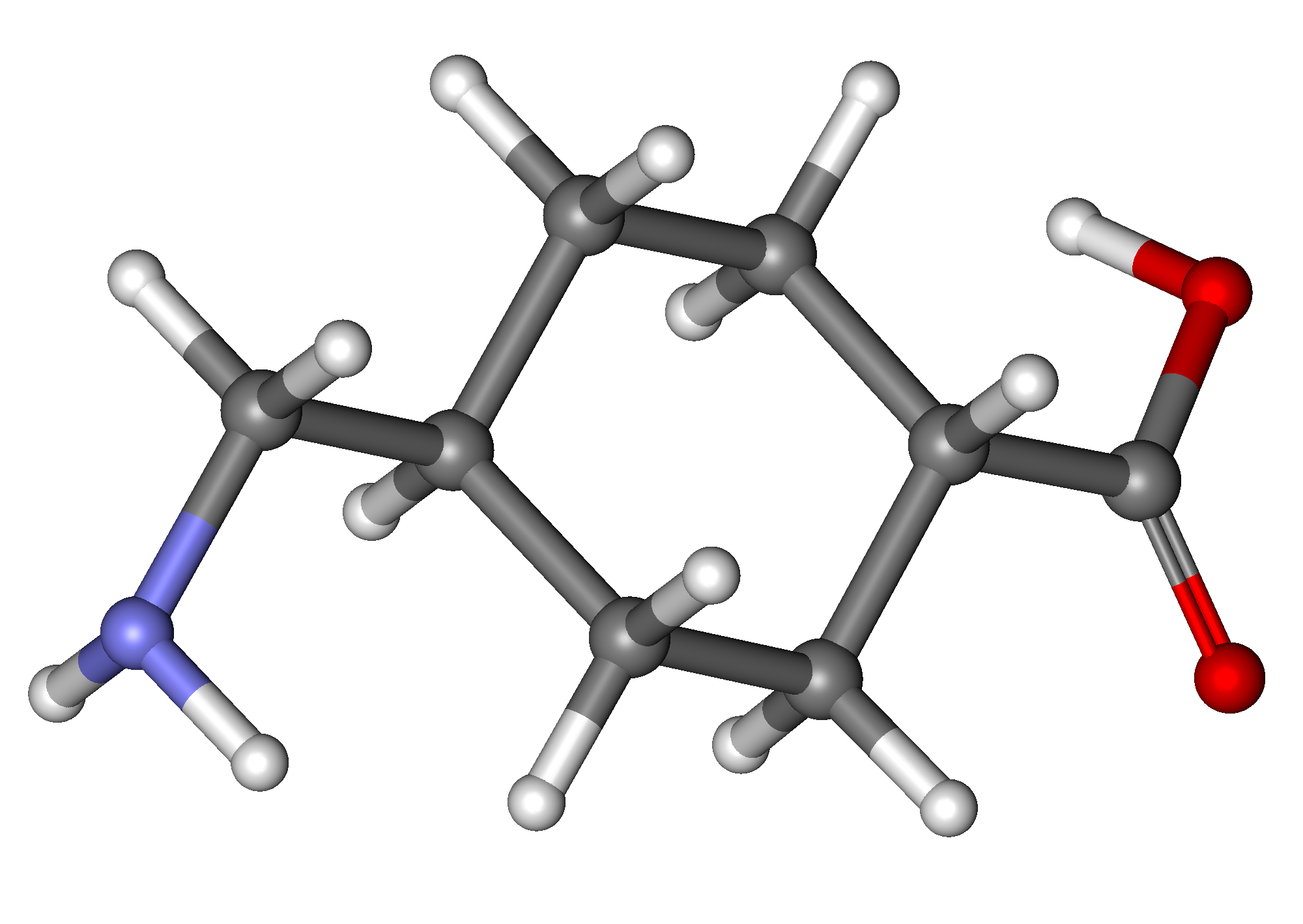
Cyklokapron (Tranexamic acid)

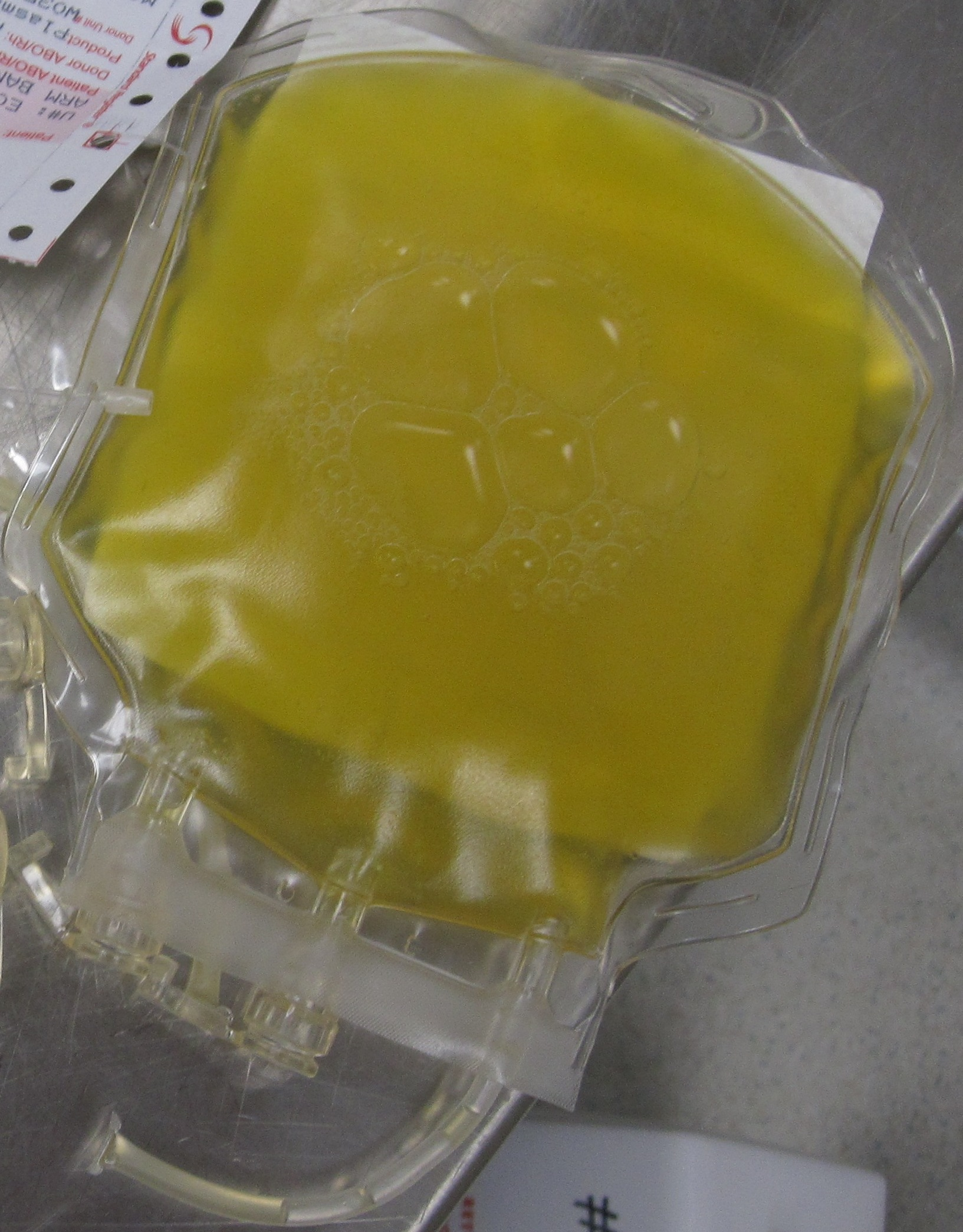
Fresh Frozen Plasma

== See also ==
- Bleeding diathesis
- Bernard–Soulier syndrome
- Von Willebrand disease
- Vitamin K deficiency
- Congenital afibrinogenemia
- Coagulopathy
