= Asundexian =

Chemical compound

Clinical data
- Trade names: Sunharbo
- Other names: BAY-2433334; BAY2433334
- AHFS/Drugs.com: Sunharbo
- License data: US DailyMed: Asundexian
- ATC code: None

Legal status
- Legal status: US: ℞-only

Identifiers
- IUPAC name: 4-[[(2S)-2-[4-[5-Chloro-2-[4-(trifluoromethyl)triazol-1-yl]phenyl]-5-methoxy-2-oxopyridin-1-yl]butanoyl]amino]-2-fluorobenzamide
- CAS Number: 2064121-65-7
- PubChem CID: 135206011
- ChemSpider: 115009501
- UNII: LA585UM8DE
- KEGG: D12838

Chemical and physical data
- Formula: C_{26}H_{21}ClF_{4}N_{6}O_{4}
- Molar mass: 592.94 g·mol^{−1}
- 3D model (JSmol): Interactive image
- SMILES: CC[C@@H](C(=O)NC1=CC(=C(C=C1)C(=O)N)F)N2C=C(C(=CC2=O)C3=C(C=CC(=C3)Cl)N4C=C(N=N4)C(F)(F)F)OC
- InChI: InChI=1S/C26H21ClF4N6O4/c1-3-19(25(40)33-14-5-6-15(24(32)39)18(28)9-14)36-11-21(41-2)17(10-23(36)38)16-8-13(27)4-7-20(16)37-12-22(34-35-37)26(29,30)31/h4-12,19H,3H2,1-2H3,(H2,32,39)(H,33,40)/t19-/m0/s1; Key:XYWIPYBIIRTJMM-IBGZPJMESA-N

Asundexian, sold under the brand name Sunharbo, is a Factor XIa inhibitor developed by Bayer to prevent stroke.

== Clinical trials ==
Asundexian efficacy and safety in patients have been evaluated in two clinical trial programs: phase IIb PACIFIC and phase III OCEANIC. In the phase IIb PACIFIC clinical trial programs, asundexian consistently showed no difference in bleeding rate compared with placebo and reduced the risk of bleeding compared with apixaban. All three trials in the programs were not powered to show efficacy of asundexian. However, a phase III trial, OCEANIC-AF, demonstrated a hazard ratio of 3.8 for stroke or systemic embolism with asundexian vs apixaban, so it was stopped due to a "lack of efficacy." The remaining active study OCEANIC-STROKE was recommended to continue as planned. Bayer is reevaluating the design of the OCEANIC-AFINA based on the findings of the OCEANIC trial.

In February 2026, the OCEANIC-STROKE trial was completed. This was a multicentre, randomised, double-blind, placebo-controlled study involving 12,000 people worldwide who had suffered a non-cardioembolic ischaemic stroke or a transient ischaemic attack. The trial revealed a 26% reduction in the rate of recurrence without major bleeding, a typical complication of antithrombotic drugs.
