= Fidanacogene elaparvovec =

Gene therapy

Gene therapy
- Vector: Adeno-associated virus

Clinical data
- Trade names: Beqvez, others
- Other names: SPK-9001, fidanacogene elaparvovec-dzkt
- AHFS/Drugs.com: Monograph
- MedlinePlus: a624028
- License data: US DailyMed: Fidanacogene elaparvovec
- Routes of administration: Intravenous
- ATC code: B02BD17 (WHO)

Legal status
- Legal status: CA: ℞-only / Schedule D; US: ℞-only; EU: Rx-only

Identifiers
- CAS Number: 1954659-47-2
- DrugBank: DB16783
- UNII: 413EU9081Y
- KEGG: D12908

Fidanacogene elaparvovec, sold under the brand name Beqvez among others, is a gene therapy delivered via adeno-associated virus used for the treatment of hemophilia B (congenital Factor IX deficiency).

Fidanacogene elaparvovec was approved for medical use in Canada in December 2023, in the United States in April 2024, and in the European Union in July 2024.

== Medical uses ==
In the US, fidanacogene elaparvovec is indicated for the treatment of adults with moderate to severe hemophilia B (congenital factor IX deficiency) who currently use factor IX prophylaxis therapy; or have current or historical life-threatening hemorrhage; or have repeated, serious spontaneous bleeding episodes; and do not have neutralizing antibodies to adeno-associated virus serotype Rh74var (AAVRh74var) capsid as detected by an FDA-approved test. It is given as a one-time infusion.

== Society and culture ==
=== Legal status ===
Fidanacogene elaparvovec was approved for medical use in Canada in December 2023, in the United States in April 2024, and in the European Union in July 2024. The FDA granted the application breakthrough therapy designation.

In May 2024, the Committee for Medicinal Products for Human Use of the European Medicines Agency adopted a positive opinion, recommending the granting of a conditional marketing authorization for the medicinal product Durveqtix, intended for the treatment of severe and moderately severe hemophilia B. The applicant for this medicinal product is Pfizer Europe MA EEIG. The conditional marketing authorization was granted in July 2024.

=== Economics ===
Pfizer announced a cost of 3.5 million per treatment, the same cost as the CSL Behring's competing hemophilia gene therapy etranacogene dezaparvovec.

== Research ==
Fidanacogene elaparvovec partially restored factor IX production in preliminary studies. The results of a phase 3 trial were published in September 2024. It showed that even 15 months after treatment factor IX was still being expressed and the number of bleedings had decreased significantly compared to the time before the treatment, when study participants had been given prophylactic infusions of factor IX.
