= Abelacimab =

Monoclonal antibody

Monoclonal antibody
- Type: Whole antibody
- Target: Factor XI and its active form Factor XIa

Clinical data
- Other names: MAA868
- AHFS/Drugs.com: Monograph
- License data: US DailyMed: Abelacimab; US FDA: Abelacimab
- Routes of administration: Intravenous

Legal status
- Legal status: Investigational

Identifiers
- CAS Number: 1610943-06-0
- ChemSpider: none
- KEGG: D10821

Abelacimab (MAA868), is a fully human monoclonal antibody for the treatment of thrombosis, under development by Anthos Therapeutics.

== Mechanism of action ==
It is anti-factor XI antibody. The hope behind its development is that factor XI plays a bigger role in thrombosis (via the intrinsic/contact activation pathway) than hemostasis, so targeting it might reduce clotting risks without a corresponding increase in bleeding. It has, indeed, shown overwhelming reduction in bleeding as compared to a direct oral anticoagulant (rivaroxaban) in patients with atrial fibrillation and a moderate-to-high risk of stroke. Data is insufficient for drawing a conclusion on whether it increases or decreases stroke events as compared to rivaroxaban.

== See also ==
- Antibody
- Monoclonal antibody
- Immunology
