= SPK-3006 =

Experimental gene therapy

SPK-3006 is an experimental gene therapy developed for Pompe disease by Spark Therapeutics. It is delivered via adeno-associated virus and is intended to increase alpha-glucosidase production in the liver.
