= Voretigene neparvovec =

Gene therapy medication

Gene therapy
- Target gene: RPE65
- Vector: Adeno-associated virus serotype 2
- Nucleic acid type: DNA

Clinical data
- Trade names: Luxturna
- Other names: voretigene neparvovec-rzyl
- AHFS/Drugs.com: Professional Drug Facts
- License data: US DailyMed: Voretigene neparvovec
- Pregnancy category: AU: B2
- Routes of administration: Subretinal injection
- ATC code: S01XA27 (WHO)

Legal status
- Legal status: AU: S4 (Prescription only); CA: Rx-only / Schedule D; US: ℞-only; EU: Rx-only; CH: Rx-only

Identifiers
- CAS Number: 1646819-03-5
- DrugBank: DB13932
- UNII: 2SPI046IKD
- KEGG: D11008

Voretigene neparvovec, sold under the brand name Luxturna, is a gene therapy medication for the treatment of Leber congenital amaurosis.

Leber's congenital amaurosis, or biallelic RPE65-mediated inherited retinal disease, is an inherited disorder causing progressive blindness. Voretigene is the first treatment available for this condition. The gene therapy is not a cure for the condition, but substantially improves vision in those treated. It is given as a subretinal injection.

Voretigene neparvovec was approved for medical use in the United States in December 2017, in Australia in August 2020, in Canada in October 2020, and in Switzerland in February 2020. It was the first in vivo gene therapy approved by the US Food and Drug Administration (FDA).

== Medical uses ==
Voretigene neparvovec is indicated for the treatment of people with vision loss due to inherited retinal dystrophy caused by confirmed biallelic RPE65 mutations and who have sufficient viable retinal cells.

== Chemistry and production ==
Voretigene neparvovec is an AAV2 vector containing human RPE65 cDNA with a modified Kozak sequence. The virus is grown in HEK 293 cells and purified for administration.

== History ==
It was developed by Spark Therapeutics and Children's Hospital of Philadelphia. It was granted orphan drug designation for Leber congenital amaurosis and retinitis pigmentosa. A biologics license application was submitted to the US Food and Drug Administration (FDA) in July 2017 with Priority Review. Phase III clinical trial results were published in August 2017. On 12 October 2017, a key advisory panel to the FDA, composed of 16 experts, unanimously recommended approval of the treatment. The FDA approved the drug in December 2017. With the approval, Spark Therapeutics received a pediatric disease priority review voucher.

== Society and culture ==
=== Economics ===
The first commercial sale of voretigene neparvovec, which was also the first sale of any gene therapy product in the United States, occurred in March 2018. The price of the treatment at the time was announced as being $425,000 per eye.
