= Edward J. Benz Jr. =

American geneticist

Edward J. Benz Jr. is an American hematologist. He is the former president of Dana–Farber Cancer Institute in Boston, Massachusetts., and the Richard and Susan Smith Professor of Medicine as well as a professor of genetics at Harvard Medical School.

He was named to the presidency of Dana-Farber in 2000, succeeding David G. Nathan. He was also the chief executive officer of Dana-Farber/Partners Cancer Care, a member of the Governing Board for Dana-Farber/Boston Children's Cancer and Blood Disorders Center, and the director of the Dana-Farber/Harvard Cancer Center. In October 2016, Benz was succeeded by Dr. Laurie H. Glimcher.

== Biography ==
He earned his Doctor of Medicine from Harvard Medical School in 1973, and a master's degree (privatum) from Yale University and his bachelor's from Princeton University. His medical school thesis, which was done at Boston Children's Hospital, won the Soma Weiss and Leon Resnick Awards for Research.

He completed training at the National Institutes of Health, Yale University School of Medicine and Brigham and Women's Hospital, in Boston, Mass.

He is board certified in both hematology and internal medicine and remains clinically active. He is a fellow of the American College of Physicians and is known for his work on blood disorders.

== Previous positions ==
Prior to his role at Dana-Farber, Benz was the chairman of the Department of Medicine at the Johns Hopkins University School of Medicine. At Johns Hopkins, he served as the Sir William Osler Professor of Medicine. He also served as physician in chief at Johns Hopkins Hospital.

He has also been president at the American Society of Hematology, the Association of American Cancer Institutes, the American Society for Clinical Investigation, the American Clinical and Climatological Society, and the Friends of the National Institute of Nursing Research.

== Research ==
Benz is an active researcher who receives funding through the National Institutes of Health and is part of the leukemia research program at Dana-Farber/Harvard Cancer Center. His research centers on the molecular basis and genetics around inherited blood disorders.

== Publications ==
Benz is an associate editor for the New England Journal of Medicine. He is the author of more than 300 articles, books, reviews and abstracts. In particular, he is coeditor of several standard texts:

- Hematology: Basic Principles and Practice (Silberstein, Leslie E., et al. Hematology: Basic Principles and Practice. Elsevier Health Sciences, 2012)
- Principles and Practice of Medicine (Benz, Edward J. et al. Principles and Practice of Medicine. Appleton and Lange, 2005)
- Oxford Textbook of Medicine, 4th ed. (Warrell, D.A., et al. Oxford Textbook of Medicine. Oxford University Press, 2003)

== Awards and honors ==
- Margaret L. Kripke Legend Award, 2011
- American Society of Hematology Mentoring Award in Basic Science, 2007
- Chair, National Institutes of Health Director's Blue Ribbon Panel on the future of Intramural Clinical Research, 2003
- Royal Society of Medicine Book Award (for Oxford Textbook of Medicine), 2003
- Elected to: Institute of Medicine, American Academy of Arts and Sciences, American Society for Clinical Investigation, and the Association of American Physicians.
