= Etranacogene dezaparvovec =

Gene therapy medication

Gene therapy
- Target gene: Factor IX
- Vector: Adeno-associated virus
- Nucleic acid type: DNA
- Delivery method: Intravenous

Clinical data
- Trade names: Hemgenix
- Other names: AMT-061, etranacogene dezaparvovec-drlb
- License data: US DailyMed: Etranacogene dezaparvovec
- Pregnancy category: AU: B2
- Routes of administration: Intravenous infusion
- ATC code: B02BD16 (WHO)

Legal status
- Legal status: AU: S4 (Prescription only); CA: ℞-only / Schedule D; US: ℞-only; EU: Rx-only

Identifiers
- CAS Number: 2156583-26-3
- DrugBank: DB16791
- UNII: Z5XCD5Q9RL
- KEGG: D12500

Etranacogene dezaparvovec, sold under the brand name Hemgenix is a gene therapy used for the treatment of hemophilia B. Etranacogene dezaparvovec is an adeno-associated virus vector-based gene therapy which consists of a viral vector carrying a gene for clotting Factor IX. The gene is expressed in the liver to produce Factor IX protein, to increase blood levels of Factor IX and thereby limit bleeding episodes. Hemophilia B is a genetic bleeding disorder resulting from missing or insufficient levels of blood clotting Factor IX, a protein needed to produce blood clots to stop bleeding.

The most common adverse reactions include liver enzyme elevations, headache, mild infusion-related reactions and flu-like symptoms.

Etranacogene dezaparvovec was approved for medical use in the United States in November 2022, in the European Union in February 2023, and in Canada in October 2023.

== Medical uses ==
Etranacogene dezaparvovec is indicated for the treatment of adults with hemophilia B (congenital Factor IX deficiency) who use Factor IX prophylaxis therapy, or have current or historical life-threatening hemorrhage, or have repeated, serious spontaneous bleeding episodes.

== History ==
The safety and effectiveness of etranacogene dezaparvovec were evaluated by the US Food and Drug Administration (FDA) in two studies of 57 adult men 18 to 75 years of age with severe or moderately severe hemophilia B. Effectiveness was established based on decreases in the men's annualized bleeding rate (ABR). In one study, which had 54 participants, the subjects had increases in Factor IX activity levels, a decreased need for routine Factor IX replacement prophylaxis, and a 54% reduction in ABR compared to baseline.

The FDA granted the application for etranacogene dezaparvovec priority review, orphan drug, and breakthrough therapy designations. In November 2022, the FDA granted approval of Hemgenix to uniQure and CSL Behring LLC.

== Society and culture ==
=== Economics ===
Etranacogene dezaparvovec costs US$3.5 million per dose. The manufacturer claims that the drug will reduce total health care costs because patients will have fewer bleeding incidents and need fewer clotting treatments.

=== Legal status ===
In December 2022, the Committee for Medicinal Products for Human Use (CHMP) of the European Medicines Agency (EMA) adopted a positive opinion, recommending the granting of a conditional marketing authorization for the medicinal product Hemgenix, intended for the treatment of severe and moderately severe hemophilia B. The applicant for this medicinal product is CSL Behring GmbH. Etranacogene dezaparvovec was approved for medical use in the European Union in February 2023.
