= Fitusiran =

Medication

Clinical data
- Trade names: Qfitlia
- Other names: ALN-AT3SC
- AHFS/Drugs.com: Monograph
- MedlinePlus: a625058
- License data: US DailyMed: Fitusiran
- Routes of administration: Subcutaneous
- Drug class: Anthithrombin production inhibitor
- ATC code: B02BX12 (WHO)

Legal status
- Legal status: US: ℞-only

Identifiers
- CAS Number: 1499251–18–1
- DrugBank: DB15002
- UNII: SV9W47ZLE1
- KEGG: D11810

Chemical and physical data
- Formula: C_{520}H_{636}F_{21}N_{175}Na_{43}O_{309}P_{43}S_{6}
- Molar mass: 17193.48 g·mol^{−1}

Fitusiran, sold under the brand name Qfitlia, is a medication used for the treatment of hemophilia. It is an antithrombin-directed small interfering ribonucleic acid. It is given by subcutaneous injection. Fitusiran reduces the amount of a protein called antithrombin.

The most common side effects include viral infection, common cold symptoms (nasopharyngitis) and bacterial infection.

Fitusiran was approved for medical use in the United States in March 2025. The US Food and Drug Administration considers it to be a first-in-class medication.

== Medical uses ==
Fitusiran is indicated for routine prophylaxis to prevent or reduce the frequency of bleeding episodes in people aged twelve years of age and older with hemophilia A or hemophilia B, with or without factor VIII or IX inhibitors (neutralizing antibodies).

== Adverse effects ==
The US prescription label for fitusiran contains a boxed warning for thrombotic events (blood clotting) and gallbladder disease (with some recipients requiring gallbladder removal). The label also has a warning about liver toxicity and the need to monitor liver blood tests at baseline and then monthly for at least six months after initiating treatment with fitusiran or after a dose increase of fitusiran.

== History ==
The efficacy and safety of fitusiran were assessed in two multicenter, randomized clinical trials which enrolled a total of 177 adult and pediatric male participants with either hemophilia A or hemophilia B. In one study, participants had inhibitory antibodies to coagulation factor VIII or coagulation factor IX and previously received on-demand treatment with medicines known as "bypassing agents" for bleeding. In the second study, participants did not have inhibitory antibodies to coagulation factor VIII or coagulation factor IX and previously received on-demand treatment with clotting factor concentrates. In the two randomized trials, participants received either a fixed dose of fitusiran monthly or their usual on-demand treatment (bypassing agents or clotting factor concentrates) as needed for nine months. The fixed dose of fitusiran is not approved because it led to excessive clotting in some participants.

The US Food and Drug Administration (FDA) granted the application for fitusiran orphan drug and fast track designations. The FDA granted the approval of Qfitlia to Sanofi.

== Society and culture ==
=== Legal status ===
Fitusiran was approved for medical use in the United States in March 2025.

=== Names ===
Fitusiran is the international nonproprietary name.

Fitusiran is sold under the brand name Qfitlia.
