= Haemophilia B =

Genetic X-linked recessive bleeding disorder

- Other names: Hemophilia B, Christmas disease
- This condition is inherited in an X-linked recessive manner.
- Specialty: Haematology
- Symptoms: Easy bruising
- Causes: Factor IX deficiency
- Diagnostic method: Bleeding scores, Coagulation factor assays
- Treatment: Factor IX concentrate

Haemophilia B, also spelled hemophilia B, is a blood clotting disorder causing easy bruising and bleeding due to an inherited mutation of the gene for factor IX, and resulting in a deficiency of factor IX. It is less common than factor VIII deficiency (haemophilia A).

Haemophilia B was first recognized as a distinct disease entity in 1952. It is also known by the eponym Christmas disease, named after Stephen Christmas, the first patient described with haemophilia B. In addition, the first report of its identification was published in the Christmas edition of the British Medical Journal.

Most individuals who have hemophilia B and experience symptoms are men. The prevalence of hemophilia B in the population is about one in 40,000; hemophilia B represents about 15% of patients with hemophilia. Many female carriers of the disease have no symptoms. However, an estimated 10-25% of female carriers have mild symptoms; in rare cases, female carriers may have moderate or severe symptoms.

== Signs and symptoms ==
Symptoms include easy bruising, urinary tract bleeding (haematuria), nosebleeds (epistaxis), and bleeding into joints (haemarthrosis).

=== Complications ===
Patients with bleeding disorders show a higher incidence of periodontal disease as well as dental caries, concerning the fear of bleeding which leads to a lack of oral hygiene and oral health care. The most prominent oral manifestation of a mild haemophilia B would be gingival bleeding during exfoliation of primary dentition, or prolonged bleeding after an invasive procedure/tooth extraction; In severe haemophilia, there may be spontaneous bleeding from the oral tissues (e.g. soft palate, tongue, buccal mucosa), lips and gingiva, with ecchymoses. In rare cases, haemarthrosis (bleeding into joint space) of the temporomandibular joint (TMJ) may be observed.

Patients with haemophilia will experience many episodes of oral bleeding over their lifetime. Average 29.1 bleeding events per year are serious enough to require factor replacement in F VIII-deficient patients which 9% involved oral structures. Children with severe haemophilia have significant lower prevalence of dental caries and lower plaque scores compared with matched, healthy controls.

== Genetics ==
X chromosome

The factor IX gene is located on the X chromosome (Xq27.1-q27.2). It is an X-linked recessive trait, which explains why males are affected in greater numbers. A change in the F9 gene, which makes blood clotting factor IX (9), causes haemophilia B.

In 1990, George Brownlee and Merlin Crossley showed that two sets of genetic mutations were preventing two key proteins from attaching to the DNA of people with a rare and unusual form of haemophilia B – haemophilia B Leyden – where patients experience episodes of excessive bleeding in childhood but have few bleeding problems after puberty.This lack of protein attachment to the DNA was thereby turning off the gene that produces clotting factor IX, which prevents excessive bleeding.

In about one third of people born with haemophilia, there is no history of the disorder in the family. This happens when a genetic change in the F8 or F9 gene occurs randomly during reproduction and is passed on at conception. And once haemophilia appears in a family the genetic change is then passed on from parents to children following the usual pattern for haemophilia.

== Pathophysiology ==
Coagulation (FIX is on left)

Factor IX deficiency leads to an increased propensity for haemorrhage, which can be either spontaneously or in response to mild trauma.

Factor IX deficiency can cause interference of the coagulation cascade, thereby causing spontaneous haemorrhage when there is trauma. Factor IX when activated activates factor X which helps fibrinogen to fibrin conversion.

Factor IX becomes active eventually in coagulation by cofactor factor VIII (specifically IXa). Platelets provide a binding site for both cofactors. This complex (in the coagulation pathway) will eventually activate factor X.

== Diagnosis ==
The diagnosis for haemophilia B can be done via the following tests/methods:

- Coagulation screening test
- Bleeding scores
- Coagulation factor assays

=== Differential diagnosis ===
The differential diagnosis for this inherited condition is the following: haemophilia A, factor XI deficiency, von Willebrand disease, fibrinogen disorders and Bernard–Soulier syndrome

== Treatment ==
Treatment is given intermittently, when there is significant bleeding. It includes intravenous infusion of factor IX and/or blood transfusions. NSAIDS should be avoided once the diagnosis is made since they can exacerbate a bleeding episode. Any surgical procedure should be done with concomitant tranexamic acid.

Etranacogene dezaparvovec (Hemgenix) was approved for medical use in the United States in November 2022. It is the first gene therapy approved by the US Food and Drug Administration (FDA) to treat hemophilia B.Fitusiran (Qfitlia) was approved for medical use in the United States in March 2025.

=== Dental considerations ===
Surgical treatment, including a simple dental extraction, must be planned to minimize the risk of bleeding, excessive bruising, or haematoma formation. Soft vacuum-formed splints can be used to provide local protection following a dental extraction or prolonged post-extraction bleed.

== Research ==
In July 2022 results of a gene therapy candidate for haemophilia B called FLT180 were announced, it works using an adeno-associated virus (AAV) to restore the clotting factor IX (FIX) protein, normal levels of the protein were observed with low doses of the therapy but immunosuppression was necessitated to decrease the risk of vector-related immune responses.

One notable development in this field is the U.S. Food and Drug Administration (FDA)-approved gene therapy Hemgenix (etranacogene dezaparvovec). This single-dose therapy utilizes an AAV vector to deliver a modified Factor IX gene, allowing endogenous production of FIX. Clinical trials have demonstrated that Hemgenix reduces the need for regular FIX infusions and lowers annual bleeding rates in individuals with severe Hemophilia B.

A group of products called hemostasis rebalancing agents, that alter the balance of hemostasis, is currently undergoing a study. The alteration of hemostasis would affect individuals with defective hemostasis (which could cause haemophilia B), have a normal hemostatic response.

Non-factor replacement therapies offer an alternative to traditional FIX infusions by targeting different mechanisms of the coagulation cascade to enhance hemostasis and reduce bleeding episodes.

1. Monoclonal Antibodies
  - Fitusiran: An investigational therapy that utilizes small interfering RNA (siRNA) technology to reduce antithrombin levels, thereby increasing thrombin generation and promoting clot formation. Early clinical studies suggest that fitusiran can significantly reduce bleeding events in individuals with Hemophilia A and B, including those with inhibitors.
2. Tissue Factor Pathway Inhibitor (TFPI) Inhibitors
  - Concizumab: A monoclonal antibody targeting TFPI, designed to restore hemostasis by enhancing thrombin production. Currently in late-stage clinical trials, Concizumab has demonstrated efficacy in reducing bleeding episodes in individuals with Hemophilia B, regardless of inhibitor status.
3. Small Interfering RNA (siRNA) Therapies
  - siRNA therapies, such as fitusiran, function by silencing specific genes involved in coagulation regulation. These treatments offer the potential for once-monthly or less frequent dosing, providing a more convenient alternative to traditional FIX therapy.

Future Directions Ongoing research continues to investigate novel therapeutic approaches, including enhanced gene therapy vectors with prolonged efficacy, combination therapies that optimize clotting function, and further refinements in non-factor treatments. As these therapies progress through clinical trials and regulatory evaluations, they may offer improved management options for individuals with Hemophilia B, potentially reducing treatment burden and enhancing long-term health outcomes.

Additional studies of gene therapy products and approaches are under way in preclinical studies and later-phase clinical trials.

== History ==
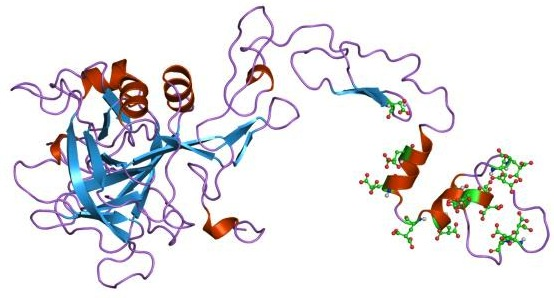
Factor IX

Stephen Christmas (12 February 1947 – 20 December 1993) was the first patient described to have Christmas disease (or Haemophilia B) in 1952 by a group of British doctors. Christmas was born to a British family in London. He was the son of film and television actor Eric Christmas. He emigrated to Toronto, Ontario, Canada, with his family, and was there at the age of two years that hemophilia was diagnosed at the Hospital for Sick Children. The family returned to London in 1952 to visit their relatives, and during the trip Stephen was admitted to hospital. A sample of his blood was sent to the Oxford Haemophilia Centre in Oxford, where Rosemary Biggs and Robert Gwyn Macfarlane discovered that he was not deficient in Factor VIII, which is normally decreased in classic hemophilia, but a different protein, which received the name Christmas factor in his honour (and later Factor IX). Stephen was dependent on blood and plasma transfusions, and was infected with HIV in the period during which blood was not routinely screened for this virus. He became an active worker for the Canadian Hemophilia Society and campaigned for transfusion safety ever since getting infected, but developed AIDS and died from it in 1993.

In the 1950s and 1960s, with newfound technology and gradual advances in medicine, pharmaceutical scientists found a way to take the factor IX from fresh frozen plasma (FFP) and give it to those with haemophilia B. Though they found a way to treat the disease, the FFP contained only a small amount of factor IX, requiring large amounts of FFP to treat an actual bleeding episode, which resulted in the person requiring hospitalization. By the mid-1960s scientists found a way to get a larger amount of factor IX from FFP. By the late 1960s, pharmaceutical scientists found methods to separate the factor IX from plasma, which allows for neatly packaged bottles of factor IX concentrates. With the rise of factor IX concentrates it became easier for people to get treatment at home. Although these advances in medicine had a significant positive impact on the treatment of haemophilia, there were many complications that came with it. By the early 1980s, scientists discovered that the medicines they had created were transferring blood-borne viruses, such as hepatitis, and HIV, the virus that causes AIDS. With the rise of these deadly viruses, scientists had to find improved methods for screening the blood products they received from donors. In 1982, scientists made a breakthrough in medicine and were able to clone factor IX gene. With this new development it decreased the risk of the many viruses. Although the new factor was created, it was not available for haemophilia B patients until 1997.

In 2009, an analysis of genetic markers revealed that haemophilia B was the blood disease affecting many European royal families of the United Kingdom, Germany, Russia and Spain: so-called "Royal Disease".

== Society and culture ==
Haemophilia B became known as "Royal Disease" due to its presence in European families. Queen Victoria was a carrier of haemophilia B who later passed these onto other ruling families from Russia, Spain and Germany.

== See also ==
- Haemophilia A
- Haemophilia C
- Haemophilia in European royalty
- von Willebrand's disease
