= Factor XI =

Mammalian protein found in Homo sapiens

F11
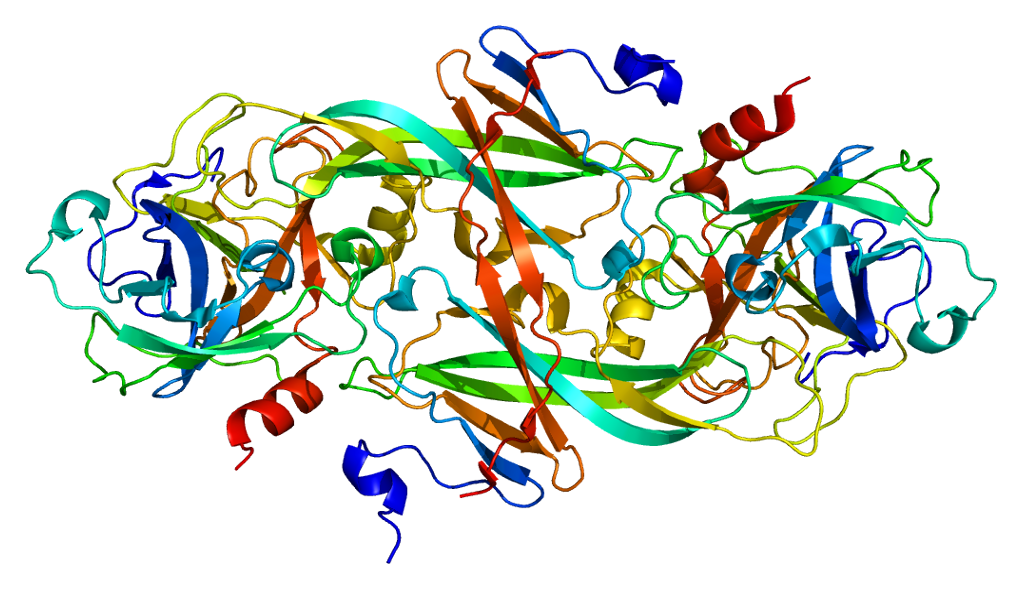

Identifiers
- Aliases: F11, FXI, coagulation factor XI, PTA, factor XI
- External IDs: OMIM: 264900; MGI: 99481; GeneCards: F11
Available structures
PDB	Ortholog search: PDBe RCSB
PDB	List of PDB id codes 1XX9, 1XXD, 1XXF, 1ZHM, 1ZHP, 1ZHR, 1ZJD, 1ZLR, 1ZMJ, 1ZML, 1ZMN, 1ZOM, 1ZPB, 1ZPC, 1ZPZ, 1ZRK, 1ZSJ, 1ZSK, 1ZSL, 1ZTJ, 1ZTK, 1ZTL, 2F83, 2FDA, 2J8J, 2J8L, 3BG8, 3SOR, 3SOS, 4CR5, 4CR9, 4CRA, 4CRB, 4CRC, 4CRD, 4CRE, 4CRF, 4CRG, 4NA7, 4NA8, 4TY6, 4TY7, 4WXI, 4X6M, 4X6N, 4X6O, 4X6P, 4Y8X, 4Y8Y, 4Y8Z, 4D7F, 5E2O, 5E2P, 4D76, 4D7G, 5EXL, 5I25, 5EXM, 5EOD, 5EXN, 5EOK
Enzyme activity
EC #	BRENDA	ExPASy	KEGG	MetaCyc
3.4.21.27	↗	↗	↗	↗

Gene location (Human)
Chr.	Chromosome 4 (human)
Band	4q35.2	Start	186,266,189 bp
Band	4q35.2	End	186,289,681 bp

Gene location (Mouse)
Chr.	Chromosome 8 (mouse)
Band	8 B1.1|8 25.14 cM	Start	45,694,211 bp
Band	8 B1.1|8 25.14 cM	End	45,715,068 bp
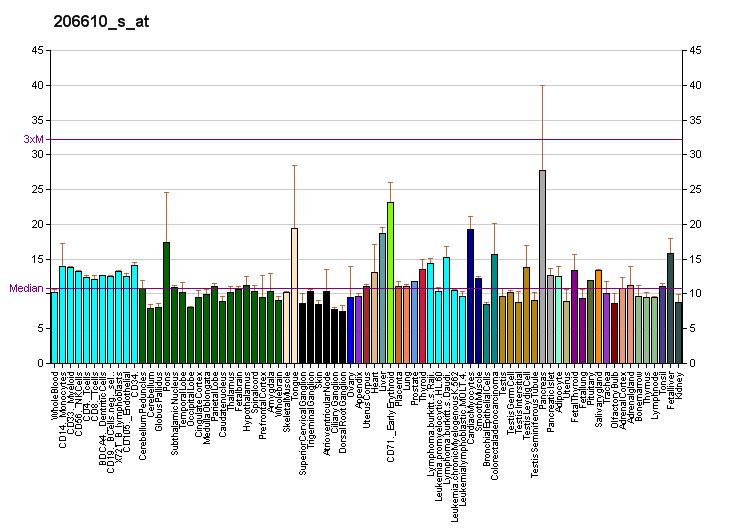
RNA expression pattern
Bgee	Human / Mouse (ortholog); Top expressed in: right lobe of liver; body of pancreas; jejunal mucosa; renal medulla; testicle; pancreatic epithelial cell; duodenum; pancreatic ductal cell; human kidney; gallbladder / Top expressed in: left lobe of liver; right lobe of liver; fetal liver hematopoietic progenitor cell; sexually immature organism; seminiferous tubule; neural layer of retina; human fetus; atrioventricular valve; spermatid; ureter; More reference expression data
BioGPS	More reference expression data
Gene ontology
Molecular function	serine-type aminopeptidase activity; peptidase activity; heparin binding; serine-type endopeptidase activity; serine-type peptidase activity; protein binding; hydrolase activity; identical protein binding
Cellular component	extracellular region; plasma membrane; extracellular exosome; membrane; extracellular space
Biological process	hemostasis; blood coagulation, intrinsic pathway; plasminogen activation; regulation of blood coagulation; proteolysis; positive regulation of fibrinolysis; blood coagulation
Sources:Amigo / QuickGO
Orthologs
Databases	NCBI: entry; OMA: entry
Species	Human	Mouse
Entrez	2160	109821
Ensembl	ENSG00000088926	ENSMUSG00000031645
UniProt	P03951	Q91Y47
RefSeq (mRNA)	NM_000128; NM_019559; NM_001354804	NM_028066
RefSeq (protein)	NP_000119; NP_001341733	NP_082342
Location (UCSC)	Chr 4: 186.27 – 186.29 Mb	Chr 8: 45.69 – 45.72 Mb
PubMed search
- Wikidata
View/Edit Human	View/Edit Mouse

Factor XI, or plasma thromboplastin antecedent, is the zymogen form of factor XIa, one of the enzymes involved in coagulation. Like many other coagulation factors, it is a serine protease. In humans, factor XI is encoded by F11 gene.

== Function ==
Factor XI (FXI) is produced by the liver and circulates as a homo-dimer in its inactive form. The plasma half-life of FXI is approximately 52 hours. The zymogen factor is activated into factor XIa by factor XIIa (FXIIa), thrombin, and FXIa itself; due to its activation by FXIIa, FXI is a member of the "contact pathway" (which includes HMWK, prekallikrein, factor XII, factor XI, and factor IX).

Factor XIa activates factor IX by selectively cleaving arg-ala and arg-val peptide bonds. Factor IXa, in turn, forms a complex with Factor VIIIa (FIXa-FVIIIa) and activates factor X.

Physiological inhibitors of factor XIa include protein Z-dependent protease inhibitor (ZPI, a member of the serine protease inhibitor/serpin class of proteins), which is independent of protein Z (its action on factor X, however, is protein Z-dependent, hence its name).

== Structure ==
Although synthesized as a single polypeptide chain, FXI circulates as a homodimer. Every chain has a relative molecular mass of approximately 80000. Typical plasma concentrations of FXI are 5 μg/mL, corresponding to a plasma concentration (of FXI dimers) of approximately 30 nM. The FXI gene is 23kb in length, has 15 exons, and is found on chromosome 4q32-35.

Factor XI consists of four apple domains, that create a disk-like platform around the base of a fifth, catalytic serine protease domain. One contains a binding site for thrombin, another for high molecular weight kininogen, a third one for factor IX, heparin and glycoprotein Ib and the fourth is implicated in forming the factor XI homodimer, including a cysteine residue that creates a disulfide bond.

In the homodimer, the apple domains create two disk-like platforms connected together at an angle, with the catalytic domains sticking out at each side of the dimer.

Activation by thrombin or factor XIIa is achieved by cleavage of Arg369-Ile370 peptide bonds on both subunits of the dimer. This results in a partial detachment of the catalytic domain from the disk-like apple domains, still linked to the fourth domain with a disulfide bond, but now farther from the third domain. This is thought that this exposes the factor IX binding site of the third apple domain, allowing factor XI's protease activity on it.

== Role in disease ==
Deficiency of factor XI causes the rare hemophilia C; this mainly occurs in Ashkenazi Jews and is believed to affect approximately 8% of that population. Less commonly, hemophilia C can be found in Jews of Iraqi ancestry and in Israeli Arabs. The condition has been described in other populations at around 1% of cases. There is little spontaneous bleeding, but surgical procedures may cause excessive blood loss, and prophylaxis is required.

Low levels of factor XI also occur in many other disease states, including Noonan syndrome.

High levels of factor XI have been implicated in thrombosis, although it is uncertain what determines these levels and how serious the procoagulant state is.

=== Inhibition ===
Pharmacological inhibitors of factor XI that are under clinical development but not yet approved for treatment as of May 2022 include the oral factor XIa inhibitors Asundexian (BAY 2433334) and Milvexian as well as the monoclonal anti-factor XI antibody abelacimab (MAA868). The idea behind producing such an inhibitor is that XI is mostly involved in intrinsic/contact activation pathway, which plays a bigger role in thrombosis as opposed to hemostasis, so targeting it may reduce clotting risks without a corresponding increase in bleeding. An abelacimab trial appears to have indeed produced this result.

== See also ==
- Contact activation pathway (also known as the intrinsic pathway)
- Tissue factor pathway (also known as the extrinsic pathway)
