= Factor VIII =

Blood-clotting protein

F8
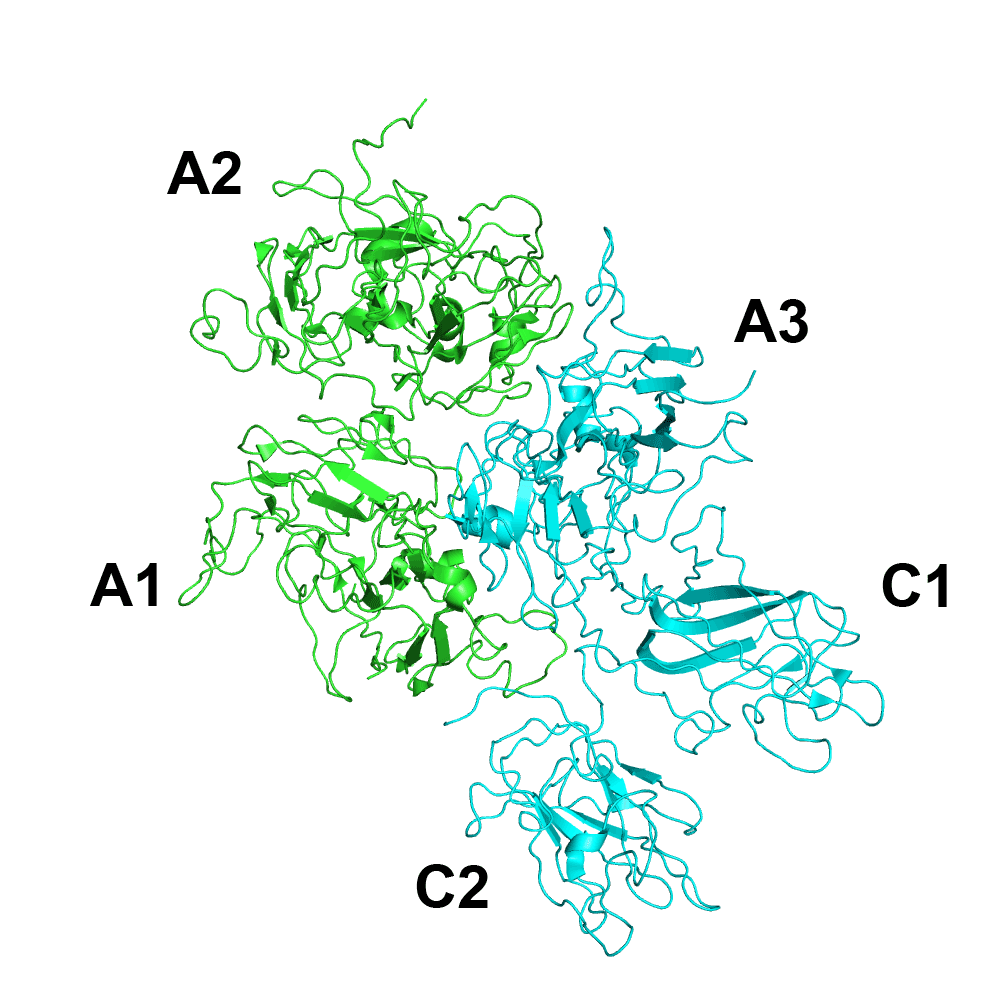

Identifiers
- Aliases: F8, AHF, DXS1253E, F8B, F8C, FVIII, HEMA, coagulation factor VIII, THPH13
- External IDs: OMIM: 300841; MGI: 88383; GeneCards: F8
Available structures
PDB	Ortholog search: PDBe RCSB
PDB	List of PDB id codes 1CFG, 1D7P, 1IQD, 2R7E, 3CDZ, 3HNB, 3HNY, 3HOB, 4BDV, 1FAC, 3J2Q, 3J2S, 4KI5, 4PT6, 4XZU

Gene location (Human)
Chr.	X chromosome (human)
Band	Xq28	Start	154,835,788 bp
Band	Xq28	End	155,026,940 bp

Gene location (Mouse)
Chr.	X chromosome (mouse)
Band	X A7.3|X 38.17 cM	Start	74,216,321 bp
Band	X A7.3|X 38.17 cM	End	74,426,221 bp
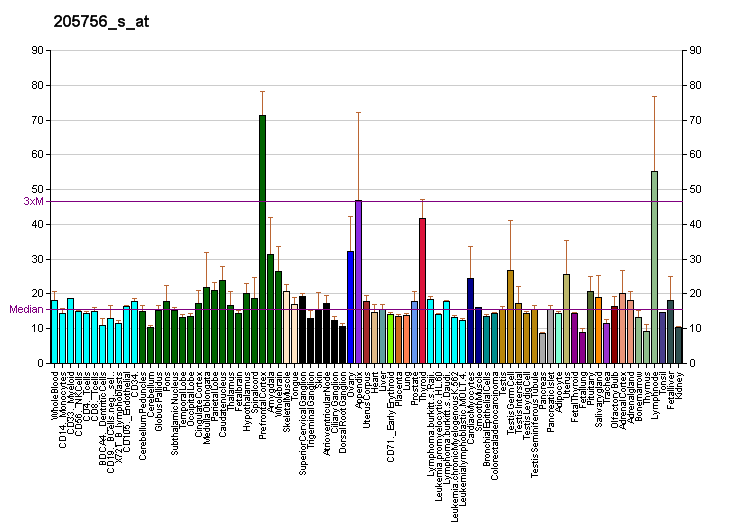
RNA expression pattern
Bgee	Human / Mouse (ortholog); Top expressed in: myocardium of left ventricle; right ventricle; right auricle of heart; cardiac muscle tissue of right atrium; tibialis anterior muscle; apex of heart; pericardium; abdominal fat; lower lobe of lung; Epithelium of choroid plexus / Top expressed in: mesenteric lymph nodes; olfactory epithelium; liver; embryo; right kidney; embryo; left lobe of liver; genital tubercle; proximal tubule; tail of embryo; More reference expression data
BioGPS	More reference expression data
Gene ontology
Molecular function	metal ion binding; protein binding; oxidoreductase activity; copper ion binding
Cellular component	endoplasmic reticulum lumen; plasma membrane; extracellular region; COPII-coated ER to Golgi transport vesicle; endoplasmic reticulum-Golgi intermediate compartment membrane; platelet alpha granule lumen; Golgi membrane; extracellular space
Biological process	hemostasis; platelet degranulation; blood coagulation; endoplasmic reticulum to Golgi vesicle-mediated transport; COPII vesicle coating; acute-phase response; blood coagulation, intrinsic pathway; platelet activation
Sources:Amigo / QuickGO
Orthologs
Databases	NCBI: entry; OMA: entry
Species	Human	Mouse
Entrez	2157	14069
Ensembl	ENSG00000185010	ENSMUSG00000031196
UniProt	P00451	Q06194
RefSeq (mRNA)	NM_000132; NM_019863	NM_001161373; NM_001161374; NM_007977
RefSeq (protein)	NP_000123; NP_063916	NP_001154845; NP_001154846; NP_032003
Location (UCSC)	Chr X: 154.84 – 155.03 Mb	Chr X: 74.22 – 74.43 Mb
PubMed search
- Wikidata
View/Edit Human	View/Edit Mouse

Coagulation factor VIII (factor VIII, FVIII, also known as antihemophilic factor A (AHF)) is an essential blood clotting protein. In humans, it is encoded by F8 gene. Defects in this gene result in hemophilia A, an X-linked bleeding disorder.

Factor VIII is produced in the liver's sinusoidal cells and endothelial cells outside the liver throughout the body. This protein circulates in the bloodstream in an inactive form, bound to a plasma carrier (another protein) called von Willebrand factor, until an injury that damages blood vessels occurs. In response to injury, coagulation factor VIII is activated and separates from von Willebrand factor. The active protein (sometimes written as coagulation factor VIIIa) interacts (by an as-yet-unknown mechanism) with another coagulation factor called factor IX. This interaction sets off a chain of additional chemical reactions that form a blood clot.

Factor VIII participates in blood coagulation; it is a cofactor for factor IXa, which, in the presence of Ca^{2+} and phospholipids, forms a complex that converts factor X to the activated form Xa. The factor VIII gene produces two alternatively spliced transcripts. Transcript variant 1 encodes a large glycoprotein, isoform a, which circulates in plasma and associates with von Willebrand factor in a noncovalent complex. This protein undergoes multiple cleavage events. Transcript variant 2 encodes a putative small protein, isoform b, which consists primarily of the phospholipid binding domain of factor VIIIc. This binding domain is essential for coagulant activity.

People with high levels of factor VIII are at increased risk for deep vein thrombosis and pulmonary embolism. Copper is a required cofactor for factor VIII and copper deficiency is known to increase the activity of factor VIII.

Factor VIII is on the World Health Organization's List of Essential Medicines.

== Genetics ==
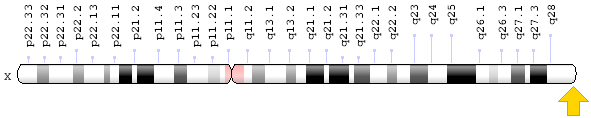
In human, the F8 gene is located on the X chromosome at position q28.

Factor VIII was first characterized in 1984 by scientists at Genentech. The gene for factor VIII is located on the X chromosome (Xq28). The gene for factor VIII presents an interesting primary structure, as another gene (F8A1) is embedded in one of its introns.

== Structure ==
Factor VIII protein consists of six domains: A1-A2-B-A3-C1-C2, and is homologous to factor V.

The A domains are homologous to the A domains of the copper-binding protein ceruloplasmin. The C domains belong to the phospholipid-binding discoidin domain family, and the C2 domain mediate membrane binding.

Activation of factor VIII to factor VIIIa is done by cleavage and release of the B domain. The protein is now divided to a heavy chain, consisting of the A1-A2 domains, and a light chain, consisting of the A3-C1-C2 domains. Both form non-covalently a complex in a calcium-dependent manner. This complex is the pro-coagulant factor VIIIa.

== Physiology ==
FVIII is a glycoprotein procofactor. Although the primary site of release in humans is ambiguous, it is synthesized and released into the bloodstream by the vascular, glomerular, and tubular endothelium, and the sinusoidal cells of the liver. Hemophilia A has been corrected by liver transplantation. Transplanting hepatocytes was ineffective, but liver endothelial cells were effective.

In the blood, it mainly circulates in a stable noncovalent complex with von Willebrand factor. Upon activation by thrombin (factor IIa), it dissociates from the complex to interact with factor IXa in the coagulation cascade. It is a cofactor to factor IXa in the activation of factor X, which, in turn, with its cofactor factor Va, activates more thrombin. Thrombin cleaves fibrinogen into fibrin which polymerizes and crosslinks (using factor XIII) into a blood clot.

The factor VIII protein has a half-life of 12 hours in the blood stream when stabilized by the von Willebrand factor.

No longer protected by vWF, activated FVIII is proteolytically inactivated in the process (most prominently by activated protein C and factor IXa) and quickly cleared from the blood stream.

Factor VIII is not affected by liver disease. In fact, levels usually are elevated in such instances.

== Medical use ==
FVIII concentrated from donated blood plasma, or recombinant FVIII can be given to hemophiliacs to restore hemostasis. Bypassing agents such as recombinant FVIIa can be used in acquired hemophilia.

Antibody formation to factor VIII can also be a major concern for patients receiving therapy against bleeding; the incidence of these inhibitors is dependent of various factors, including the factor VIII product itself.

== Immunostain target ==
Factor VIII related antigen is used as a target for immunohistochemistry, where endothelial cells, megakaryocytes, platelets and mast cells normally stain positive.

== Contamination scandal ==
In the 1980s, some pharmaceutical companies such as Baxter International and Bayer sparked controversy by continuing to sell contaminated factor VIII after new heat-treated versions were available. Under FDA pressure, unheated product was pulled from US markets, but was sold to Asian, Latin American, and some European countries. The product was tainted with HIV, a concern that had been discussed by Bayer and the U.S. Food and Drug Administration (FDA).

== History ==
Factor VIII was first discovered in 1937, but it was not until 1979 that its purification by Edward Tuddenham, Frances Rotblat and coworkers led to the molecular identification of the protein.
