= Reperfusion therapy =

Restoring blood flow post-heart attack

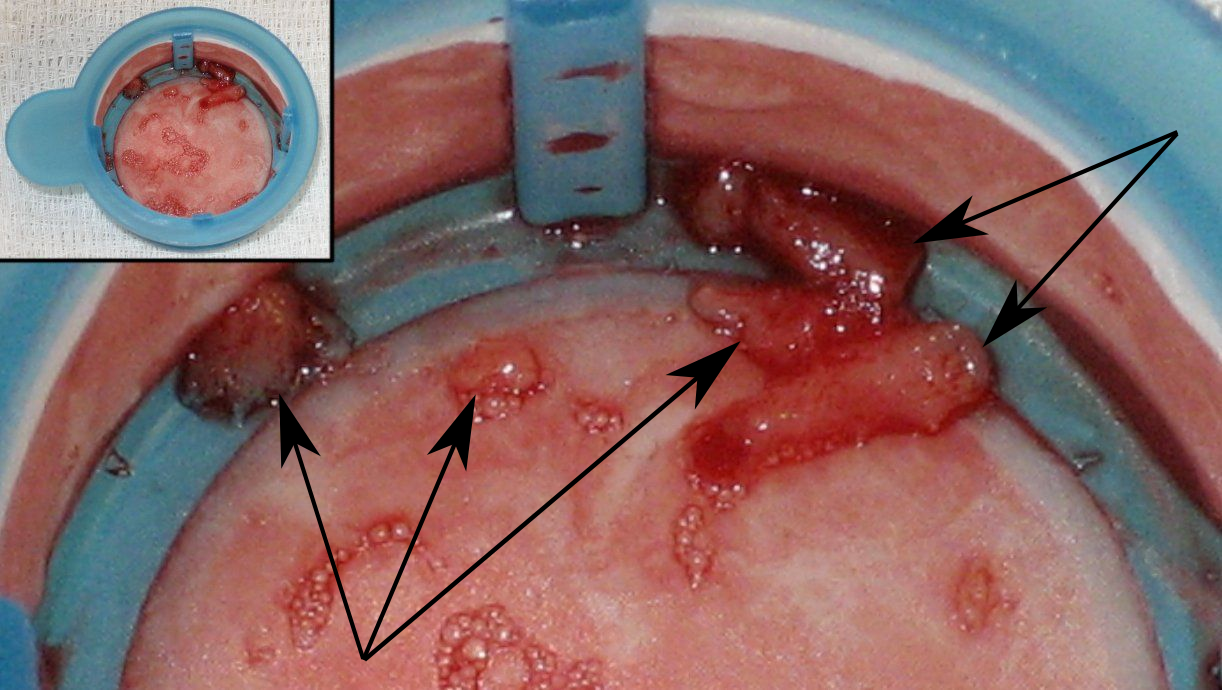
- Thrombus material (in a cup, upper left corner) removed from a coronary artery during an angioplasty to abort a myocardial infarction. Five pieces of thrombus are shown (arrow heads).

Reperfusion therapy is a medical treatment to restore blood flow, either through or around, blocked arteries, typically after a heart attack (myocardial infarction (MI)). Reperfusion therapy includes drugs and surgery. The drugs are thrombolytics and fibrinolytics used in a process called thrombolysis. Surgeries performed may be minimally-invasive endovascular procedures such as a percutaneous coronary intervention (PCI), which involves coronary angioplasty. The angioplasty uses the insertion of a balloon and/or stents to open up the artery. Other surgeries performed are the more invasive bypass surgeries that graft arteries around blockages.

If an MI is presented with ECG evidence of an ST elevation known as STEMI, or if a bundle branch block is similarly presented, then reperfusion therapy is necessary. In the absence of an ST elevation, a non-ST elevation MI, known as an NSTEMI, or an unstable angina may be presumed (both of these are indistinguishable on initial evaluation of symptoms). ST elevations indicate a completely blocked artery needing immediate reperfusion. In NSTEMI the blood flow is present but limited by stenosis. In NSTEMI, thrombolytics must be avoided as there is no clear benefit of their use. If the condition stays stable a cardiac stress test may be offered, and if needed subsequent revascularization will be carried out to restore a normal blood flow. If the blood flow becomes unstable an urgent angioplasty may be required. In these unstable cases the use of thrombolytics is contraindicated.

At least 10% of treated cases of STEMI do not develop necrosis of the heart muscle. A successful restoration of blood flow is known as aborting the heart attack. About 25% of STEMIs can be aborted if treated within the hour of symptoms onset.

== Thrombolytic therapy ==
=== Myocardial infarction ===
Thrombolytic therapy is indicated for the treatment of STEMI – if it can begin within 12 hours of the onset of symptoms, and the person is eligible based on exclusion criteria, and a coronary angioplasty is not immediately available. Thrombolysis is most effective in the first 2 hours. After 12 hours, the risk of intracranial bleeding associated with thrombolytic therapy outweighs any benefit. Because irreversible injury occurs within 2–4 hours of the infarction, there is a limited window of time available for reperfusion to work.

Thrombolytic drugs are contraindicated for the treatment of unstable angina and NSTEMI and for the treatment of individuals with evidence of cardiogenic shock.

Although no perfect thrombolytic agent exists, ideally it would lead to rapid reperfusion, have a high sustained patency rate, be specific for recent thrombi, be easily and rapidly administered, create a low risk for intracerebral bleeding and systemic bleeding, have no antigenicity, adverse hemodynamic effects, or clinically significant drug interactions, and be cost effective. Currently available thrombolytic agents include streptokinase, urokinase, and alteplase (recombinant tissue plasminogen activator, rtPA). More recently, thrombolytic agents similar in structure to rtPA such as reteplase and tenecteplase have been used. These newer agents boast efficacy at least as well as rtPA with significantly easier administration. The thrombolytic agent used in a particular individual is based on institution preference and the age of the patient.

Depending on the thrombolytic agent being used, additional anticoagulation with heparin or low molecular weight heparin may be of benefit. With tPa and related agents (reteplase and tenecteplase), heparin is needed to keep the coronary artery open. Because of the anticoagulant effect of fibrinogen depletion with streptokinase and urokinase treatment, it is less necessary there.

=== Failure ===
Thrombolytic therapy to abort a myocardial infarction is not always effective. The degree of effectiveness of a thrombolytic agent is dependent on the time since the myocardial infarction began, with the best results occurring if the thrombolytic is used within two hours of the onset of symptoms. Failure rates of thrombolytics can be as high as 50%. In cases of failure of the thrombolytic agent to open the infarct-related coronary artery, the person is then either treated conservatively with anticoagulants and allowed to "complete the infarction" or percutaneous coronary intervention (and coronary angioplasty) is then performed. Percutaneous coronary intervention in this setting is known as "rescue PCI" or "salvage PCI". Complications, particularly bleeding, are significantly higher with rescue PCI than with primary PCI due to the action of the thrombolytic.

=== Side effects ===
Intracranial bleeding (ICB) and subsequent stroke is a serious side effect of thrombolytic use. The risk factors for developing intracranial bleeding include a previous episode of intracranial bleed, advanced age of the individual, and the thrombolytic regimen that is being used. In general, the risk of ICB due to thrombolytics is between 0.5 and 1 percent.

== Coronary angioplasty ==
The benefit of prompt, primary angioplasty over thrombolytic therapy for acute STEMI is now well established. When performed rapidly, an angioplasty restores flow in the blocked artery in more than 95% of patients compared with the reperfusion rate of about 65% achieved by thrombolysis. Logistic and economic obstacles seem to hinder a more widespread application of angioplasty, although the feasibility of providing regionalized angioplasty for STEMI is currently being explored in the United States. The use of a coronary angioplasty to abort a myocardial infarction is preceded by a primary percutaneous coronary intervention. The goal of a prompt angioplasty is to open the artery as soon as possible, and preferably within 90 minutes of the patient presenting to the emergency room. This time is referred to as the door-to-balloon time. Few hospitals can provide an angioplasty within the 90 minute interval, which prompted the American College of Cardiology (ACC) to launch a national Door to Balloon (D2B) Initiative in November 2006. Over 800 hospitals have joined the D2B Alliance as of March 16, 2007.

One particularly successful implementation of a primary PCI protocol is in the Calgary Health Region under the auspices of the Libin Cardiovascular Institute of Alberta. Under this model, EMS teams responding to an emergency can transmit the ECG directly to a digital archiving system that allows emergency room staff to immediately confirm the diagnosis. This in turn allows for redirection of the EMS teams to those facilities that are ready to conduct time-critical angioplasty. This protocol has resulted in a median time to treatment of 62 minutes.

The current guidelines in the United States restrict angioplasties to hospitals with available emergency bypass surgery as a backup, but this is not the case in other parts of the world.

A PCI involves performing a coronary angiogram to determine the location of the infarcting vessel, followed by balloon angioplasty (and frequently deployment of an intracoronary stent) of the stenosed arterial segment. In some settings, an extraction catheter may be used to attempt to aspirate (remove) the thrombus prior to balloon angioplasty. While the use of intracoronary stents do not improve the short term outcomes in primary PCI, the use of stents is widespread because of the decreased rates of procedures to treat restenosis compared to balloon angioplasty.

Adjuvant therapy during an angioplasty includes intravenous heparin, aspirin, and clopidogrel. Glycoprotein IIb/IIIa inhibitors are often used in the setting of primary angioplasty to reduce the risk of ischemic complications during the procedure. Due to the number of antiplatelet agents and anticoagulants used during primary angioplasty, the risk of bleeding associated with the procedure is higher than during an elective procedure.

== Coronary artery bypass surgery ==
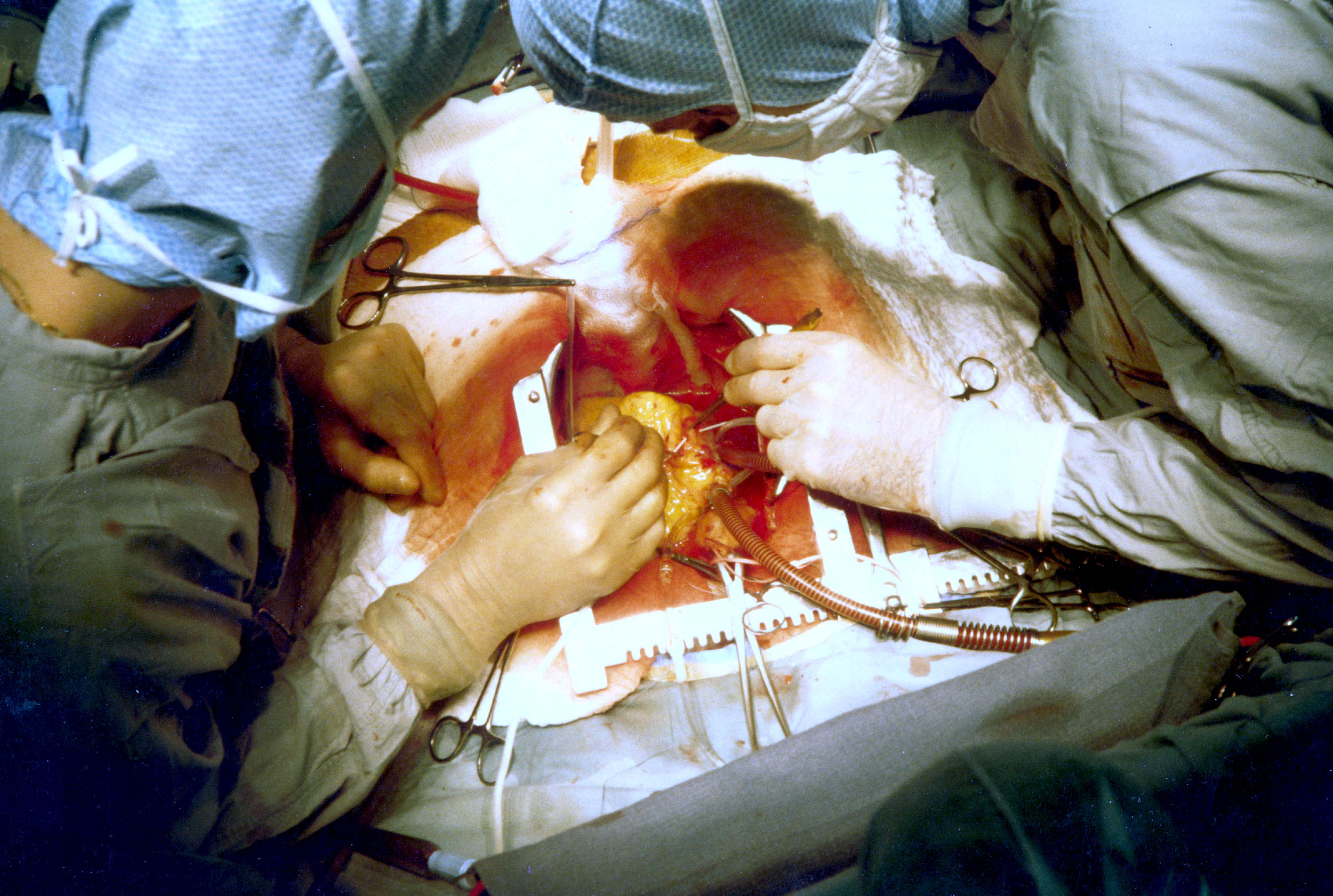
Coronary artery bypass surgery during mobilization (freeing) of the right coronary artery from its surrounding tissue, adipose tissue (yellow). The tube visible at the bottom is the aortic cannula (returns blood from the HLM). The tube above it (obscured by the surgeon on the right) is the venous cannula (receives blood from the body). The patient's heart is stopped and the aorta is cross-clamped. The patient's head (not seen) is at the bottom.

Emergency bypass surgery for the treatment of an acute myocardial infarction (MI) is less common than PCI or thrombolysis. From 1995 to 2004, the percentage of people with cardiogenic shock treated with primary PCI rose from 27.4% to 54.4%, while the increase in coronary artery bypass graft surgery (CABG) was only from 2.1% to 3.2%. Emergency CABG is usually undertaken to simultaneously treat a mechanical complication, such as a ruptured papillary muscle, or a ventricular septal defect, with ensuing cardiogenic shock. In uncomplicated MI, the mortality rate can be high when the surgery is performed immediately following the infarction. If this option is entertained, the patient should be stabilized prior to surgery, with supportive interventions such as the use of an intra-aortic balloon pump. In patients developing cardiogenic shock after a myocardial infarction, both PCI and CABG are satisfactory treatment options, with similar survival rates.

Coronary artery bypass surgery involves an artery or vein from the patient being implanted to bypass narrowings or occlusions in the coronary arteries. Several arteries and veins can be used, however internal mammary artery grafts have demonstrated significantly better long-term patency rates than great saphenous vein grafts. In patients with two or more coronary arteries affected, bypass surgery is associated with higher long-term survival rates compared to percutaneous interventions. In patients with single vessel disease, surgery is comparably safe and effective, and may be a treatment option in selected cases. Bypass surgery has higher costs initially, but becomes cost-effective in the long term. A surgical bypass graft is more invasive initially but bears less risk of recurrent procedures (but these may be again minimally invasive).

== Reperfusion arrhythmia ==
Accelerated idioventricular rhythm which looks like slow ventricular tachycardia is a sign of a successful reperfusion. No treatment of this rhythm is needed as it rarely changes into a more serious rhythm.

== See also ==
- Perfusion scanning
- Reperfusion injury
- Revascularization
- TIMI
- Ischemia-reperfusion injury of the appendicular musculoskeletal system
