= Migrainous infarction =

Migraine associated with an ischemic brain lesion

A migrainous infarction is a rare type of ischaemic stroke which occurs in correspondence with migraine aura symptoms. Symptoms include headaches, visual disturbances, strange sensations and dysphasia, all of which gradually worsen causing neurological changes which ultimately increase the risk of an ischaemic stroke. Typically, women under the age of 45 who experience migraine with aura (MA) are at the greatest risk for developing migrainous infarction, especially when combined with smoking and use of oral contraceptives.

== Symptoms and signs ==
=== Migraine with aura ===
Overall, 30% of the population with migraines will experience aura during their lifetime. Aura can be broadly defined as gradually developing attacks which cause neurological deficits in vision, sensation and language.

==== Visual disturbances ====
Visual disturbances are commonly associated with MA, with 97% of patients experiencing visual symptoms. Only 14% of patients with MA experience visual disturbances for more than 60 minutes at a time, with the median duration of visual disturbance being 30 minutes. Typically, visual disturbances in MA patients begin as a zig zag line in the middle of the ocular field which appears to be flickering. Some patients describe symptoms of an expanding red circle in the centre of their visual field. A scotoma often occurs when the visual disturbance moves to the periphery of the visual field. Additionally, a scotoma can sometimes occur in the center of the visual field which will appear as a more distinct blindspot, although this is less common.

Individuals with persistent MA may also report a visual disturbance called 'visual snow'. Generally, they will describe their visual field as consisting of many small flickering spots which may resemble snow.

==== Sensory symptoms ====
Sensory symptoms are known to occur in 32% of patients with MA and only occur for longer than 60 minutes in 21% of these patients, with the median duration being 20 minutes. Typically, the sensory aura will consist of strange sensations and pain which gradually move from the hand, through the arm, to the face and tongue areas. It is extremely rare for MA patients to experience sensory symptoms in their legs and feet.

==== Dysphasic symptoms ====
Dysphasic symptoms appear in 11% of MA patients, occurring for over 60 minutes in only 17% of patients with a median time span of 20 minutes. Dysphasia in patients with MA appears as a moderate language generation deficit, for example, the patient may be unable to state their home address. Sometimes, the patient may also experience language comprehension deficits in which they may be unable to comprehend the instructions of complex tasks.

=== Ischaemic stroke ===
Public knowledge of stroke symptoms is scarce, with only 17.2% of people being able to correctly identify an individual experiencing a stroke. Cerebral ischaemia refers to a severely reduced flow of blood in the brain due to narrowing or blocking of arteries or blood vessels causing inflammation. Ischaemic stroke is characterised by dizziness, sudden weakness and numbness, visual deficits, difficulty speaking and comprehending speech, and a severe headache.

==== Embolism ====
Approximately 36.6% of ischaemic strokes are caused by an embolism. Embolisms are an obstruction of a blood vessel in the brain, often due to a blood clot formed in the heart which travels through the blood vessels to the brain. Usually, embolic strokes cause multiple ischaemic lesions which are found in 41.2% of migrainous infarction patients.

==== Thrombosis ====
In 21.4% of cases, ischaemic strokes are caused by thrombosis. A thrombus is a blood clot which forms in a cerebral blood vessel, reducing the flow of blood through that vessel. This occlusion of blood vessels causes localised cytotoxic edema which damages the energy-dependent pumps of the cellular membrane causing intracellular inflammation.

=== Migrainous infarction ===
A history of MA is significant predictor of migrainous infarction, with 80% of migrainous infarction patients having experienced MA previously. However, migrainous infarction can also occur in those with migraine without aura, although this is less common with only 20% of migrainous infarction patients never having experienced aura. Typically, in the month prior to the cerebral infarction, the patient will experience more severe MA symptoms.

== Pathophysiology ==
=== Platelet activation ===
Enhanced platelet activation during MA has been observed which directly increases the risk of developing thrombosis. Additionally, platelet activation is enhanced in patients with MA, even during aura-free and headache-free periods. Moreover, this effect is exemplified through administration of non-selective beta-adrenergic antagonists (e.g. propranolol) which are often prescribed to reduce migraine symptoms.

=== Reduced regional cerebral blood flow ===
Contrary to the suggestion that MA initiates ischaemic infarction, one theory suggests that ischaemia may in fact cause MA. This theory is based on the finding that reduced regional Cerebral Blood Flow (rCBF) has shown to be present in patients with MA due to underlying ischaemia. Therefore, it is possible that infarction occurs due to another unknown factor causing ischaemia and MA is merely a symptom associated with the process.

=== Vasoconstriction ===
Migraines have a direct negative impact on the control of vessels in the brain, causing cerebral vasoconstriction which ultimately narrows blood vessels in the brain leading to cerebral hypoxia and tissue ischaemia. Vasoconstriction of blood vessels and arteries during migraine is thought to be caused by vasospasm. Use of a Transcranial Doppler revealed that patients with MA show prolonged diffuse vasospasm even during asymptomatic periods, although the vasospasm tends to be more severe during an aura attack.

== Diagnosis ==
=== Classification ===
For a diagnosis of migrainous infarction, the patient must meet criteria set out by the International Headache Society (IHS). The criteria include: One or more persistent aura symptom lasting more than 60 minutes and a previous medical history of migraine attacks with aura. The clinician must be certain that the infarction cannot be better explained by another medical problem or disorder. A diagnosis is confirmed when neuroimaging of the patient's brain exhibits an ischaemic infarction in an area associated with the migraine.

Overall, only 18% of patients with MA will experience any aura symptoms for longer than 60 minutes.

=== Localisation ===
CT scans, Magnetic Resonance Imaging (MRI) and Magnetic Resonance Angiography (MRA) are all common techniques which allow the localisation of brain lesions after stroke. Approximately 82% of migrainous infarction patients experience lesions in the posterior circulation, with 21% of patients also experiencing lesions in the cerebellum.

== Treatment ==
=== Clot-busting agents ===
Clot busting agents or thrombolytic therapy are a treatment option for migrainous infarction caused by enhanced platelet activation leading to thrombosis.

==== Streptokinase ====
Streptokinase is a thrombolytic agent which aims to permit reperfusion, allowing the restoration of blood flow to the ischaemic areas. Recent trials indicate that Streptokinase can improve function after a 6-month period, however, the risk of mortality due to intracerebral haemorrhage resulting from use of this thrombolytic agent is extremely high and therefore, treatment using streptokinase is not recommended.

==== Alteplase ====
Alteplase is a recombinant tissue plasminogen activator which enhances the conversion of plasminogen into plasmin to aid in the degradation of blood clots. Effectiveness depends highly on swift administration of the medication, notably, the treatment should be administered within 3 to 4.5 hours of onset of the ischaemic stroke for the most effective results. In a similar manner to Streptokinase, Alteplase increases the risk of intracranial haemorrhage, however, mortality rate is not affected.

=== Aspirin ===
Aspirin is a class anti-aggregation drug, often used to treat headaches in patients with MA. Administration of aspirin in patients with MA has been shown to be effective in reducing platelet factor 4 (PF4) concentration. PF4 promotes blood coagulation which can cause ischaemia, therefore, aspirin's ability to reduce PF4 concentration in people with MA greatly reduces the risk of migrainous infarction.
