= Ultrasound-enhanced systemic thrombolysis =

- Other names: Sonothrombolysis
- Specialty: Radiology, neurology, cardiology
- [edit on Wikidata]

Ultrasound enhanced systemic thrombolysis (UEST), also known as sonothrombolysis, is a method that uses ultrasound waves to mechanically break the thrombi, or clots, using the vibration carried via soundwaves. One major advantage of using ultrasound versus systemic thrombolysis is a reduced risk of bleeding, and improved heart function in the case of pulmonary embolism.

== Background ==
A large portion of initial research was conducted by Christy Holland, a Professor at the University Cincinnati and the Director of the University of Cincinnati Heart, Lung, and Vascular Institute, who also holds the patent for use of transcranial ultrasound in stroke patients. One of the main studies characterizing the use of UEST in the setting of acute stroke was the CLOTBUST Trial, which was published in 2004 in the Journal of Neuroimaging. Since then, research with UEST has explored its use in other thrombotic scenarios such as pulmonary embolism and deep vein thrombosis.

== Mechanism ==
UEST works by using ultrasound waves at different frequencies as an additional treatment that works with the conventional thrombolytics such as tissue plasminogen activator (tPA). Typically, frequencies are in the megahertz (MHz) range, however, some studies suggest that there is no statistically significant difference in frequency use 2 MHz or <2 MHz in the setting of ischemic stroke.

== Various Uses ==
=== Ischemic stroke ===
Transcranial Doppler ultrasound was first investigated in 2004, and demonstrated a significant clinical recovery through the use of sonothrombolysis with tPA, specifically through arterial recanalization. Of note, it is important to first rule out hemorrhagic stroke prior to the initiation of thrombolysis. A meta-analysis conducted in 2020 investigating the safety and efficacy of sonothromoblysis in 5 randomized controlled trials demonstrated that there was overall benefit to using sonothrombolysis especially in the setting of a middle cerebral artery occlusion.

=== Pulmonary Embolism ===
Another frequent condition that may require thrombolysis is a pulmonary embolism (PE), which is when a clot forms in a vein and travels to the lung vasculature, or forms directly in the lung vasculature. In certain patients with more severe forms of PE (massive or submassive), sonothrombolysis can improve cardiopulmonary function and reduce the bleeding risk that is accompanied by systemic thrombolysis. Ultrasound has been shown to be more effective in reversing the damage to the right heart from strain due to the PE, and can help return the right heart to the appropriate size, when compared to just anticoagulation.

=== Deep Vein Thrombosis ===
Studies examining the use of ultrasound enhanced thrombolysis for the treatment of deep vein thromboses (DVTs), or a clot located in the veins, are a bit more sparse, with only 1 randomized control trial up to 2018, and with many retrospective studies. A meta-analysis in 2018 looked at the efficacy of ultrasound and found that a large majority achieved significant thrombolysis, which they defined as >50% of the clot. The safety profile was also characterized in this study, and found that it was a relatively safe invasive procedure with only 1 death in 512 procedures and only 3.9% risk of significant bleeding.

=== Cardiac Disease ===
The use of ultrasound in acute cardiac disease, such as a heart attack, is still in the early stages of investigation. However, recent data does demonstrate that in patients with an ST-segment elevation myocardial infarction (STEMI), sonothrombolysis may improve flow within the impacted vessels allowing for better cardiac muscle oxygenation. The use of ultrasound was also shown to have improved left heart function several months after the acute event.

== Limitations and Future Directions ==
While there is a lot of promise in the use of sonothrombolysis, there are limitations at this time. For example, in the setting of ischemic stroke, patients with MCA territory stroke benefit the most. Moreover, the thickness of the temporal bone may also reduce efficacy of sonothrombolysis. With regard to use in cardiac disease, the coronary arteries are much more difficult to visualize with ultrasound for several reasons including obstructions and movement of the arteries while the heart contracts and relaxes.

As ultrasound technology advances, the applications continue to expand. For instance, the use of a mobile ultrasound that can pair to mobile devices could be used instead of a bulky machine, which could allow for increased access to the technology. Additionally, as the technology advances, there could be potential for sonothrombolysis to replace conventional thrombolytics given its safer side-effect profile and good efficacy.

== See also ==
- Reperfusion therapy
- Stroke
- Thrombolysis
- Ultrasound
- Pulmonary Embolism
- Deep Vein Thrombosis
- Myocardial Infarction
- Anticoagulation
