= Reteplase =

Pharmaceutical drug

Clinical data
- Trade names: Retavase, Retefuse, Rapilysin, Mirel, others
- AHFS/Drugs.com: Monograph
- License data: EU EMA: by INN
- ATC code: B01AD07 (WHO)

Identifiers
- CAS Number: 133652-38-7
- DrugBank: DB00015
- ChemSpider: none
- UNII: DQA630RIE9
- KEGG: D05721

Chemical and physical data
- Formula: C_{1736}H_{2671}N_{499}O_{522}S_{22}
- Molar mass: 39589.75 g·mol^{−1}

Reteplase, trade names include Retavase, is a thrombolytic drug, used to treat heart attacks by breaking up the clots that cause them.

Reteplase is a recombinant non-glycosylated form of human tissue plasminogen activator, which has been modified to contain 357 of the 527 amino acids of the original protein. It is produced in the bacterium Escherichia coli. Reteplase was approved for use in 1996.

Reteplase is similar to recombinant human tissue plasminogen activator (alteplase), but the modifications give reteplase a longer half-life of 13–16 minutes. Reteplase also binds fibrin with lower affinity than alteplase, improving its ability to penetrate into clots.

As reteplase is able to penetrate inside the thrombi, an enhanced fibrinolytic activity will be achieved → rapid reperfusion → low incidence of bleeding.
