= Myocardial infarction =

Interruption of cardiac blood supply

- Other names: Acute myocardial infarction (AMI), heart attack
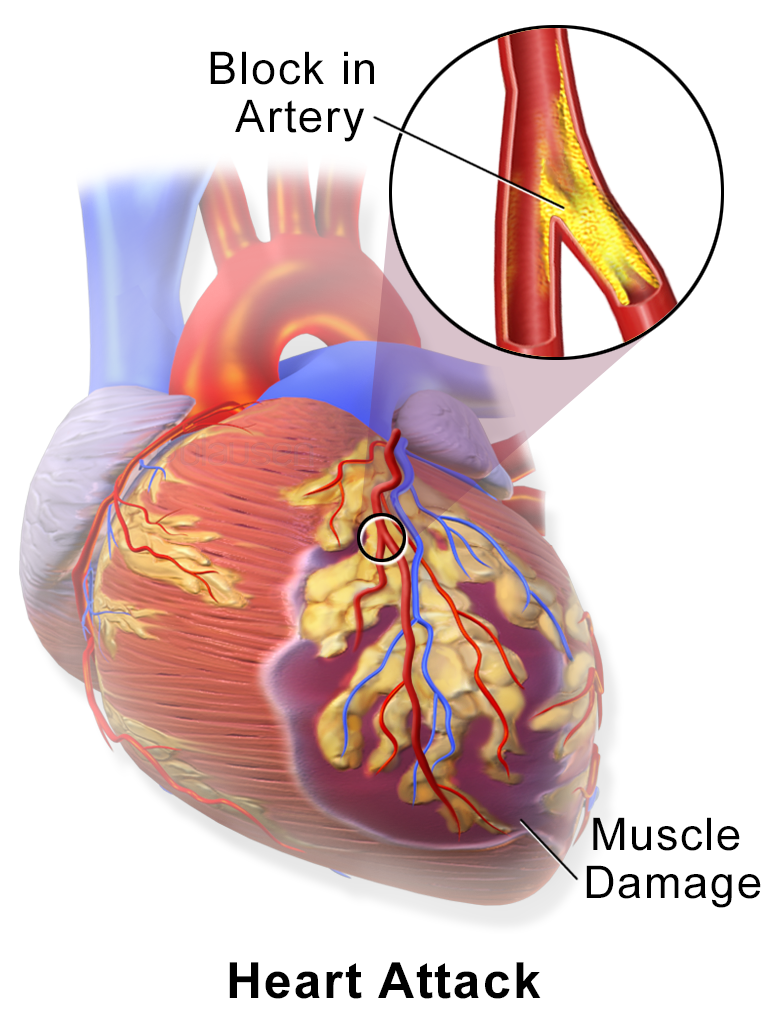
- A myocardial infarction occurs when an atherosclerotic plaque slowly builds up in the inner lining of a coronary artery and then suddenly ruptures, causing catastrophic thrombus formation, totally occluding the artery and preventing blood flow downstream to the heart muscle.
- Specialty: Cardiology, emergency medicine
- Symptoms: Chest pain, shortness of breath, nausea/vomiting, dizziness or lightheadedness, cold sweat, feeling tired; arm, neck, back, jaw, or stomach pain, decreased level or total loss of consciousness
- Complications: Heart failure, irregular heartbeat, cardiogenic shock, coma, cardiac arrest
- Causes: Angina or coronary artery disease usually
- Risk factors: High blood pressure, smoking, diabetes, lack of exercise, obesity, high blood cholesterol
- Diagnostic method: Electrocardiograms (ECGs), blood tests, coronary angiography
- Treatment: Percutaneous coronary intervention, thrombolysis
- Medication: Aspirin, nitroglycerin, heparin
- Prognosis: STEMI 10% risk of death (developed world)
- Frequency: 15.9 million (2015)

A myocardial infarction (MI), commonly known as a heart attack, occurs when blood flow decreases or stops in one of the arteries of the heart, causing infarction (tissue death) to the heart muscle. The most common symptom is retrosternal chest pain or discomfort that classically radiates to the left shoulder, arm, or jaw. The pain may occasionally feel like heartburn. This is the dangerous type of acute coronary syndrome.

Other symptoms may include shortness of breath, nausea, feeling faint, a cold sweat, feeling tired, and decreased level of consciousness. Women more often present without chest pain and instead have neck pain, arm pain or feel tired. Among those over 70-75 years old, about 5% have had an MI with little or no history of symptoms. An MI may cause heart failure, an irregular heartbeat, cardiogenic shock or cardiac arrest.

Most MIs occur due to coronary artery disease. Risk factors include high blood pressure, smoking, diabetes, lack of exercise, obesity, high blood cholesterol, poor diet, and excessive alcohol intake. The complete blockage of a coronary artery caused by a rupture of an atherosclerotic plaque is usually the underlying mechanism of an MI. MIs are less commonly caused by coronary artery spasms, which may be due to cocaine, significant emotional stress (often known as Takotsubo syndrome or broken heart syndrome) and extreme cold, among others. Many tests are helpful with diagnosis, including electrocardiograms (ECGs), blood tests and coronary angiography. An ECG, which is a recording of the heart's electrical activity, may confirm an ST elevation MI (STEMI), if ST elevation is present. Commonly used blood tests include troponin and less often creatine kinase MB.

Treatment of an MI is time-critical. Aspirin is an appropriate immediate treatment for a suspected MI. Nitroglycerin or opioids may be used to help with chest pain; however, they do not improve overall outcomes. Supplemental oxygen is recommended in those with low oxygen levels or shortness of breath. In a STEMI, treatments attempt to restore blood flow to the heart and include percutaneous coronary intervention (PCI), where the arteries are pushed open and may be stented, or thrombolysis, where the blockage is removed using medications. People who have a non-ST elevation myocardial infarction (NSTEMI) are often managed with the blood thinner heparin, with the additional use of PCI in those at high risk. In people with blockages of multiple coronary arteries and diabetes, coronary artery bypass surgery (CABG) may be recommended rather than angioplasty. After an MI, lifestyle modifications, along with long-term treatment with aspirin, beta blockers and statins, are typically recommended.

Worldwide, about 15.9 million myocardial infarctions occurred in 2015. More than 3 million people had an ST elevation MI, and more than 4 million had an NSTEMI. STEMIs occur about twice as often in men as women. About one million people have an MI each year in the United States. In the developed world, the risk of death in those who have had a STEMI is about 10%. Rates of MI for a given age have decreased globally between 1990 and 2010. In 2011, an MI was one of the top five most expensive conditions during inpatient hospitalizations in the US, with a cost of about $11.5 billion for 612,000 hospital stays.

== Terminology ==
Myocardial infarction (MI) refers to tissue death (infarction) of a part of the heart muscle (myocardium), caused by ischemia, the lack of oxygen delivery to myocardial tissue. It is a type of acute coronary syndrome, which describes a sudden or short-term change in symptoms related to blood flow to the heart. Unlike the other type of acute coronary syndrome, unstable angina, a myocardial infarction occurs when there is cell death, which can be estimated by a blood test that measures biomarkers (the cardiac protein troponin). When there is evidence of an MI, it may be classified as an ST elevation myocardial infarction (STEMI) or non-ST elevation myocardial infarction (NSTEMI) based on the results of an ECG.

Another approach suggests categorizing MI as either occlusion myocardial infarction (OMI) or non-occlusion myocardial infarction (NOMI), depending on evidence of coronary occlusion on ECG. Preliminary research suggests that using OMI/NOMI above STEMI/NSTEMI leads to improved clinical outcomes, as such terminology does not limit the diagnosis of acute coronary occlusion to current STEMI criteria, which alone have poor sensitivity for MI.

The phrase "heart attack" is often used non-specifically to refer to myocardial infarction. An MI is different from—but can cause—cardiac arrest, where the heart is not contracting at all or so poorly that all vital organs cease to function, thus leading to death. It is also distinct from heart failure, in which the pumping action of the heart is impaired. However, an MI may lead to heart failure.

== Signs and symptoms ==

Areas where pain is experienced in myocardial infarction, showing common (dark red) and less common (light red) areas on the chest (top) and back (bottom).

Chest pain that may or may not radiate to other parts of the body is the most typical and significant symptom of myocardial infarction. It might be accompanied by other symptoms such as sweating.

=== Pain ===
Chest pain is one of the most common symptoms of acute myocardial infarction and is often described as a sensation of tightness, pressure, or squeezing. Pain radiates most often to the left arm, but may also radiate to the lower jaw, neck, right arm, back, and upper abdomen. The pain most suggestive of an acute MI, with the highest likelihood ratio, is pain radiating to the right arm and shoulder. Similarly, chest pain similar to a previous heart attack is also suggestive. The pain associated with MI is usually diffuse, does not change with position, and lasts for more than 20 minutes. The pain may be described as pressure, tightness, a knife-like sensation, tearing, or burning. In some individuals it may manifest as a sense of impending doom rather than typical pain, or pain may be absent entirely. Levine's sign, in which a person localizes the chest pain by clenching one or both fists over their sternum, has classically been thought to be predictive of cardiac chest pain, although a prospective observational study showed it had a poor positive predictive value.

Typically, chest pain because of ischemia, be it unstable angina or myocardial infarction, lessens with the use of nitroglycerin, but nitroglycerin may also relieve chest pain arising from non-cardiac causes.

=== Other ===
Chest pain may be accompanied by sweating, nausea or vomiting, and fainting, and these symptoms may also occur without any pain at all. Dizziness or lightheadedness is common and occurs due to reduction in oxygen and blood to the brain. In females, the most common symptoms of myocardial infarction include shortness of breath, weakness, and fatigue. Females are more likely to have unusual or unexplained tiredness and nausea or vomiting as symptoms. Females having heart attacks are more likely to have palpitations, back pain, labored breath, vomiting, and left arm pain than males, although the studies showing these differences had high variability. Females are less likely to report chest pain during a heart attack and more likely to report nausea, jaw pain, neck pain, cough, and fatigue, although these findings are inconsistent across studies. Females with heart attacks also had more indigestion, dizziness, loss of appetite, and loss of consciousness. Shortness of breath is a common, and sometimes the only symptom, occurring when damage to the heart limits the output of the left ventricle, with breathlessness arising either from low oxygen in the blood or pulmonary edema.

Other less common symptoms include weakness, light-headedness, palpitations, and abnormalities in heart rate or blood pressure. These symptoms are likely induced by a massive surge of catecholamines from the sympathetic nervous system, which occurs in response to pain and, where present, low blood pressure. Loss of consciousness can occur in myocardial infarctions due to inadequate blood flow to the brain and cardiogenic shock, and sudden death, frequently due to the development of ventricular fibrillation. When the brain was without oxygen for too long due to a myocardial infarction, coma and persistent vegetative state can occur. Cardiac arrest, and atypical symptoms such as palpitations, occur more frequently in females, the elderly, those with diabetes, in people who have just had surgery, and in critically ill patients.

=== Absence ===
"Silent" myocardial infarctions can happen without any symptoms at all. These cases can be discovered later on electrocardiograms, using blood enzyme tests, or at autopsy after a person has died. Such silent myocardial infarctions represent between 22 and 64% of all infarctions, and are more common in the elderly, in those with diabetes mellitus and after heart transplantation. In people with diabetes, differences in pain threshold, autonomic neuropathy, and psychological factors have been cited as possible explanations for the lack of symptoms. In heart transplantation, the donor heart is not fully innervated by the nervous system of the recipient.

== Risk factors ==
The most prominent risk factors for myocardial infarction are older age, actively smoking, high blood pressure, diabetes mellitus, and total cholesterol and high-density lipoprotein levels. Many risk factors of myocardial infarction are shared with coronary artery disease, the primary cause of myocardial infarction, with other risk factors including male sex, low levels of physical activity, a past family history, obesity, and alcohol use. Risk factors for myocardial disease are often included in risk factor stratification scores, such as the Framingham Risk Score. At any given age, men are more at risk than women for the development of cardiovascular disease. High levels of blood cholesterol is a known risk factor, particularly high low-density lipoprotein, low high-density lipoprotein, and high triglycerides.

Many risk factors for myocardial infarction are potentially modifiable, with the most important being tobacco smoking (including secondhand smoke). Smoking appears to be the cause of about 36% and obesity the cause of 20% of coronary artery disease. Lack of physical activity has been linked to 7–12% of cases. Less common causes include stress-related causes such as job stress, which accounts for about 3% of cases, and chronic high stress levels.

=== Diet ===
There is varying evidence about the importance of saturated fat in the development of myocardial infarctions. Eating polyunsaturated fat instead of saturated fats has been shown in studies to be associated with a decreased risk of myocardial infarction, while other studies find little evidence that reducing dietary saturated fat or increasing polyunsaturated fat intake affects heart attack risk. Dietary cholesterol does not appear to have a significant effect on blood cholesterol and thus recommendations about its consumption may not be needed. Trans fats do appear to increase risk. Acute and prolonged intake of high quantities of alcoholic drinks (3–4 or more daily) increases the risk of a heart attack.

=== Genetics ===
Family history of ischemic heart disease or MI, particularly if one has a male first-degree relative (father, brother) who had a myocardial infarction before age 55 years, or a female first-degree relative (mother, sister) less than age 65 increases a person's risk of MI.

Genome-wide association studies have found 27 genetic variants that are associated with an increased risk of myocardial infarction. The strongest association of MI has been found with chromosome 9 on the short arm p at locus 21, which contains genes CDKN2A and 2B, although the single nucleotide polymorphisms that are implicated are within a non-coding region. The majority of these variants are in regions that have not been previously implicated in coronary artery disease. The following genes have an association with MI: PCSK9, SORT1, MIA3, WDR12, MRAS, PHACTR1, LPA, TCF21, MTHFDSL, ZC3HC1, CDKN2A, 2B, ABO, PDGF0, APOA5, MNF1ASM283, COL4A1, HHIPC1, SMAD3, ADAMTS7, RAS1, SMG6, SNF8, LDLR, SLC5A3, MRPS6, KCNE2.

=== Other ===
The risk of having a myocardial infarction increases with older age, low physical activity, and low socioeconomic status. Heart attacks appear to occur more commonly in the morning hours, especially between 6 am and noon. Evidence suggests that heart attacks are at least three times more likely to occur in the morning than in the late evening. Shift work is also associated with a higher risk of MI. One analysis has found an increase in heart attacks immediately following the start of daylight saving time.

Women who use combined oral contraceptive pills have a modestly increased risk of myocardial infarction, especially in the presence of other risk factors. The use of non-steroidal anti-inflammatory drugs (NSAIDs), even for as short as a week, increases risk.

Endometriosis in women under the age of 40 is an identified risk factor.

Patients with intravenous devices (such as a PICC line, Central Venous Catheter, and ECMO, among others) have an increased risk of DVT and thrombosis, therefore increasing the risk of a myocardial infarction and other problems caused by blood clots such as strokes.

Air pollution is also an important modifiable risk. Short-term exposure to air pollution such as carbon monoxide, nitrogen dioxide, and sulfur dioxide (but not ozone) has been associated with MI and other acute cardiovascular events. For sudden cardiac deaths, every increment of 30 units in Pollutant Standards Index correlated with an 8% increased risk of out-of-hospital cardiac arrest on the day of exposure. Extremes of temperature are also associated.

A number of acute and chronic infections including Chlamydophila pneumoniae, influenza, Helicobacter pylori, and Porphyromonas gingivalis among others have been linked to atherosclerosis and myocardial infarction. Myocardial infarction can also occur as a late consequence of Kawasaki disease.

Calcium deposits in the coronary arteries can be detected with CT scans. Calcium seen in coronary arteries can provide predictive information beyond that of classical risk factors. High blood levels of the amino acid homocysteine is associated with premature atherosclerosis; whether elevated homocysteine in the normal range is causal is controversial.

In people without evident coronary artery disease, possible causes for the myocardial infarction are coronary spasm or coronary artery dissection.

== Mechanism ==
=== Atherosclerosis ===
The animation shows plaque buildup or a coronary artery spasm can lead to a heart attack and how blocked blood flow in a coronary artery can lead to a heart attack.

The most common cause of a myocardial infarction is the rupture of an atherosclerotic plaque on an artery supplying heart muscle. Plaques can become unstable, rupture, and additionally promote the formation of a blood clot that blocks the artery; this can occur in minutes. Blockage of an artery can lead to tissue death in tissue being supplied by that artery. Atherosclerotic plaques are often present for decades before they result in symptoms.

The gradual buildup of cholesterol and fibrous tissue in plaques in the wall of the coronary arteries or other arteries, typically over decades, is termed atherosclerosis. Atherosclerosis is characterized by progressive inflammation of the walls of the arteries. Inflammatory cells, particularly macrophages, move into affected arterial walls. Over time, they become laden with cholesterol products, particularly LDL, and become foam cells. A cholesterol core forms as foam cells die. In response to growth factors secreted by macrophages, smooth muscle and other cells move into the plaque and act to stabilize it. A stable plaque may have a thick fibrous cap with calcification. If there is ongoing inflammation, the cap may be thin or ulcerate. Exposed to the pressure associated with blood flow, plaques, especially those with a thin lining, may rupture and trigger the formation of a blood clot (thrombus). The cholesterol crystals have been associated with plaque rupture through mechanical injury and inflammation.

=== Other causes ===
Atherosclerotic disease is not the only cause of myocardial infarction, but it may exacerbate or contribute to other causes. A myocardial infarction may result from a heart with a limited blood supply subject to increased oxygen demands, such as in fever, a fast heart rate, hyperthyroidism, too few red blood cells in the bloodstream, or low blood pressure. Damage or failure of procedures such as percutaneous coronary intervention (PCI) or coronary artery bypass grafts (CABG) may cause a myocardial infarction. Spasm of coronary arteries, such as Prinzmetal's angina may cause blockage.

=== Tissue death ===
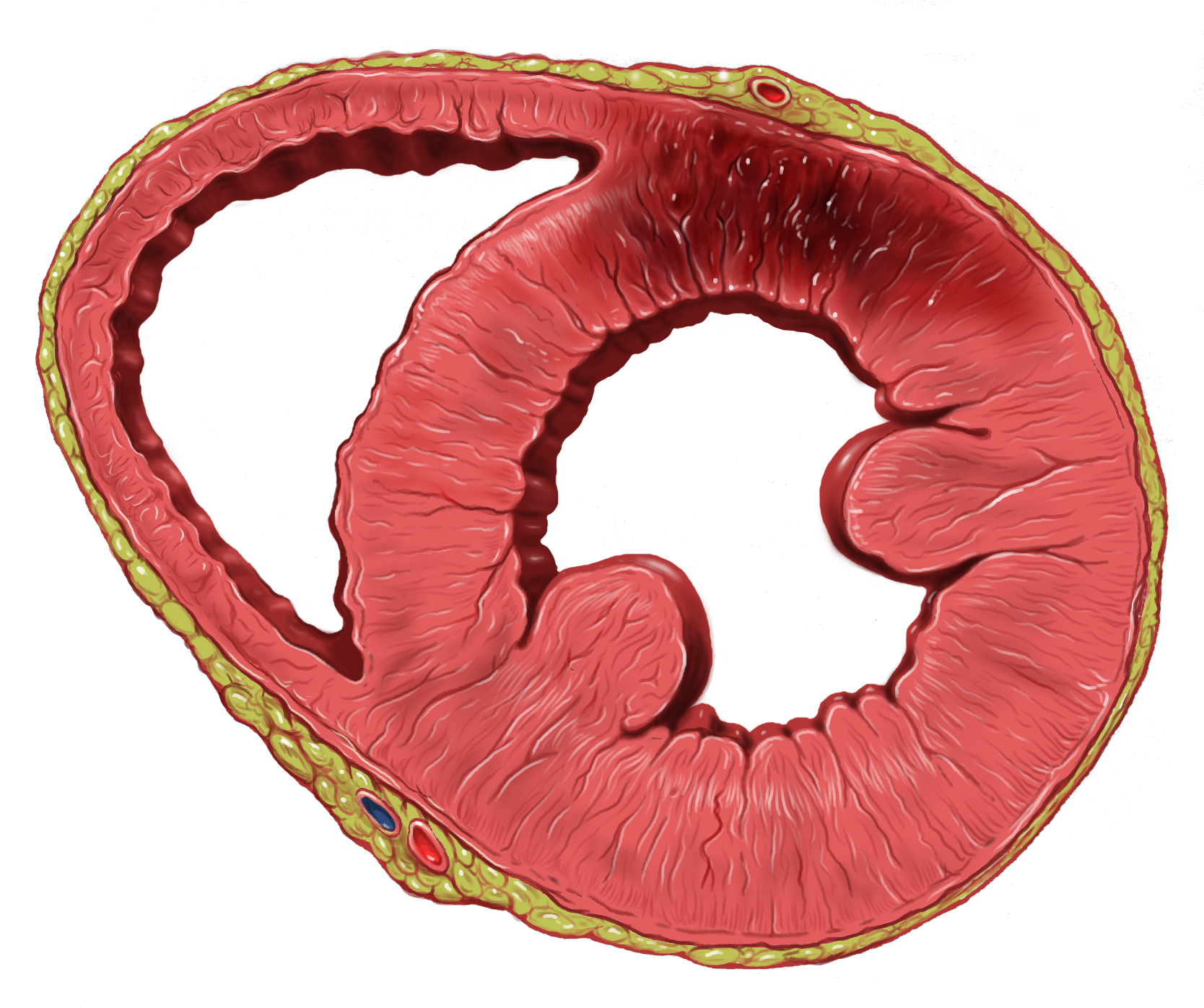
Cross section showing anterior left ventricle wall infarction

If impaired blood flow to the heart lasts long enough, it triggers a process called the ischemic cascade; the heart cells in the territory of the blocked coronary artery die (infarction), chiefly through necrosis, and do not grow back. A collagen scar forms in their place. When an artery is blocked, cells lack oxygen, needed to produce ATP in mitochondria. ATP is required for the maintenance of electrolyte balance, particularly through the Na/K ATPase. This leads to an ischemic cascade of intracellular changes, necrosis and apoptosis of affected cells.

Cells in the area with the worst blood supply, just below the inner surface of the heart (endocardium), are most susceptible to damage. Ischemia first affects this region, the subendocardial region, and tissue begins to die within 15–30 minutes of loss of blood supply. The dead tissue is surrounded by a zone of potentially reversible ischemia that progresses to become a full-thickness transmural infarct. The initial "wave" of infarction can take place over 3–4 hours. These changes are seen on gross pathology and cannot be predicted by the presence or absence of Q waves on an ECG. The position, size and extent of an infarct depends on the affected artery, totality of the blockage, duration of the blockage, the presence of collateral blood vessels, oxygen demand, and success of interventional procedures.

Tissue death and myocardial scarring alter the normal conduction pathways of the heart and weaken affected areas. The size and location put a person at risk of abnormal heart rhythms (arrhythmias) or heart block, aneurysm of the heart ventricles, inflammation of the heart wall following infarction, and rupture of the heart wall that can have catastrophic consequences.

Injury to the myocardium also occurs during reperfusion. This might manifest as ventricular arrhythmia. Reperfusion injury results from influx of calcium and sodium into cardiac cells and the release of oxygen free radicals. The no-reflow phenomenon (when blood remains unable to perfuse the affected myocardium despite clearing the occlusion) also contributes to myocardial injury. Local endothelial swelling is one of many factors contributing to this phenomenon.

== Diagnosis ==
=== Criteria ===
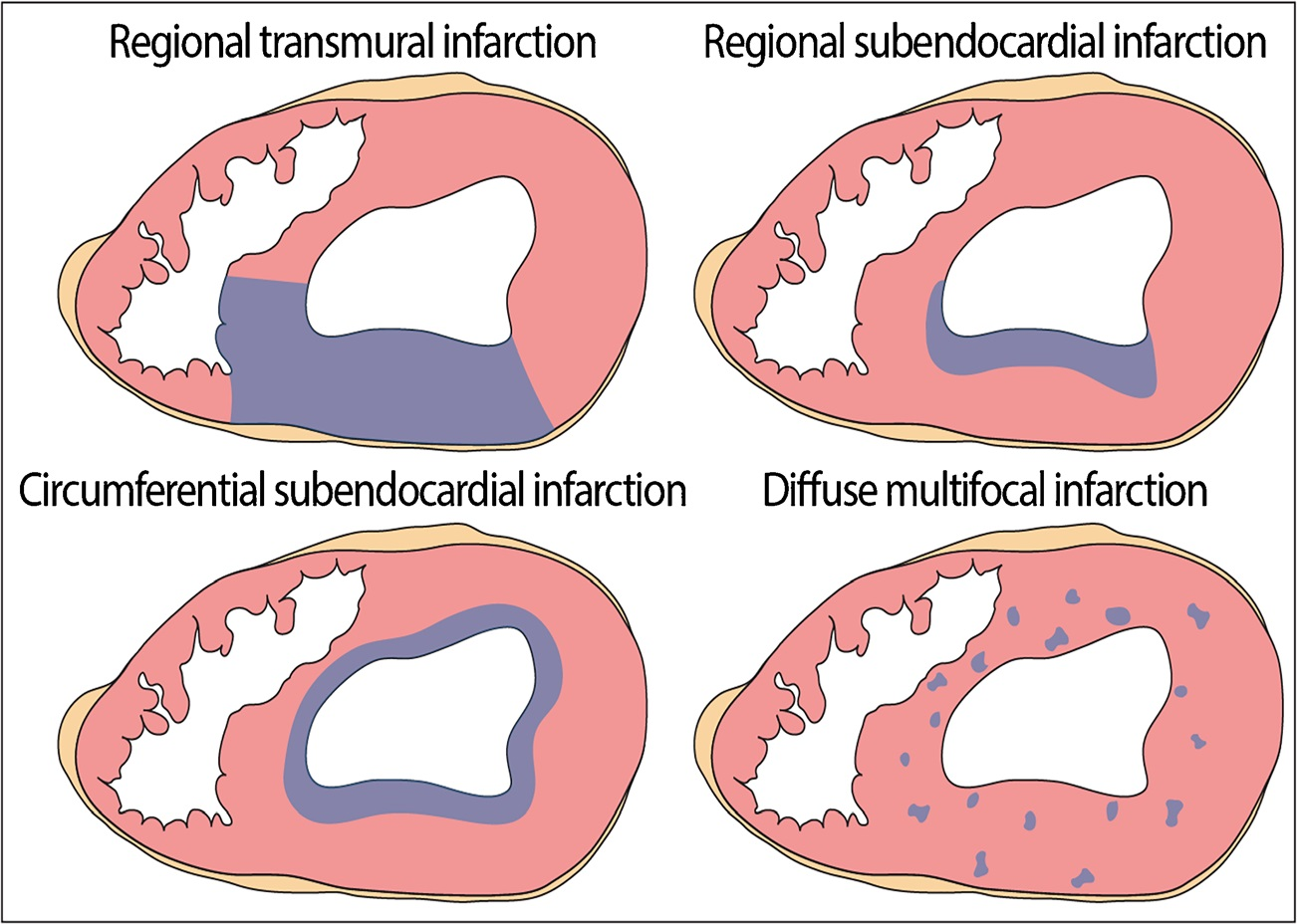
Topographic distribution of MI

A myocardial infarction, according to established consensus, is defined by elevated cardiac biomarkers with a rising or falling trend and at least one of the following:

- Symptoms relating to ischemia
- Changes on an electrocardiogram (ECG), such as ST segment changes, new left bundle branch block, or pathologic Q waves
- Changes in the motion of the heart wall on imaging
- Demonstration of a thrombus on angiogram or at autopsy.

=== Types ===
A myocardial infarction is usually clinically classified as an ST-elevation MI (STEMI) or a non-ST elevation MI (NSTEMI). These are based on ST elevation, a portion of a heartbeat graphically recorded on an ECG. STEMIs make up about 25–40% of myocardial infarctions. A more explicit classification system, based on international consensus in 2026, also exists. This classifies myocardial infarctions into three types:

1. Primary myocardial infarction arises spontaneously from acute coronary pathology, such as coronary thrombus or dissection.
2. Secondary myocardial infarction refers to coronary pathology exposed by supply-demand mismatch by some secondary cause.
3. Procedure-related myocardial infarction refers to a complication of PCI or CABG wherein the stented artery or coronary graft spontaneously occludes within 30 days of the procedure.

=== Cardiac biomarkers ===
There are many different biomarkers used to determine the presence of cardiac muscle damage. Troponins, measured through a blood test, are considered to be the best, and are preferred because they have greater sensitivity and specificity for measuring injury to the heart muscle than other tests. A rise in troponin occurs within 2–3 hours of injury to the heart muscle, and peaks within 1–2 days. The level of the troponin, as well as a change over time, are useful in measuring and diagnosing or excluding myocardial infarctions, and the diagnostic accuracy of troponin testing is improving over time. One high-sensitivity cardiac troponin can rule out a heart attack as long as the ECG is normal.

Other tests, such as CK-MB or myoglobin, are discouraged. CK-MB is not as specific as troponins for acute myocardial injury, and may be elevated with past cardiac surgery, inflammation or electrical cardioversion; it rises within 4–8 hours and returns to normal within 2–3 days. Copeptin may be useful to rule out MI rapidly when used along with troponin.

=== Electrocardiogram ===
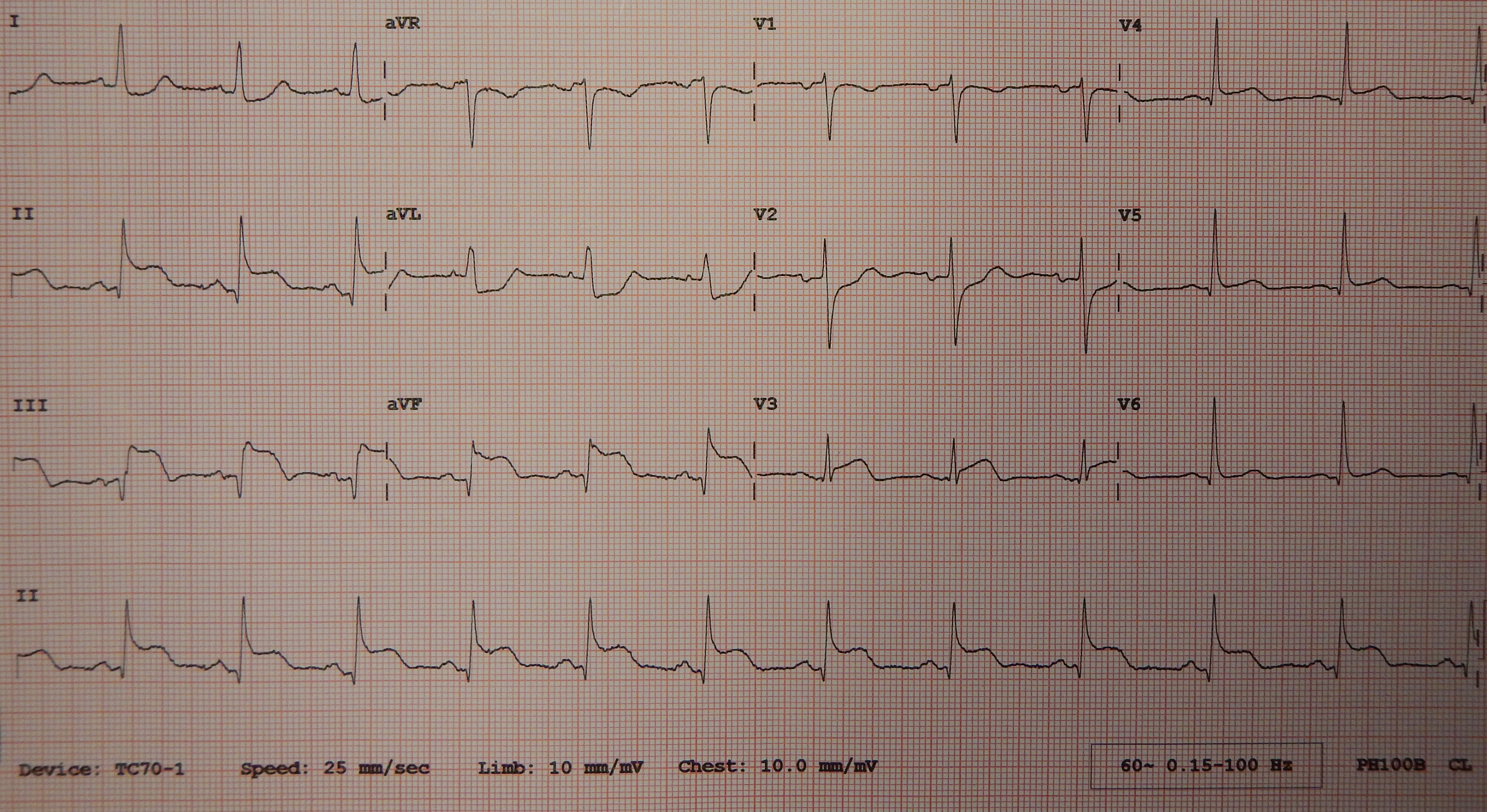
A 12-lead ECG showing an inferior STEMI due to reduced perfusion through the right coronary artery. Elevation of the ST segment can be seen in leads II, III and aVF.

An electrocardiogram (ECG) is a recording of the heart's electrical activity, acquired using electrodes placed on the skin. The taking of an ECG is an important part of the workup of an AMI, and ECGs are often not just taken once but may be repeated over minutes to hours, or in response to changes in signs or symptoms.

ECG readouts produce a waveform with different labeled features. In addition to a rise in biomarkers, a rise in the ST segment, changes in the shape or flipping of T waves, new Q waves, or a new left bundle branch block can be used to diagnose an AMI. In addition, ST elevation can be used to diagnose an ST segment myocardial infarction (STEMI). A rise must be new in V2 and V3 ≥2 mm (0.2 mV) for males or ≥1.5 mm (0.15 mV) for females or ≥1 mm (0.1 mV) in two other adjacent chest or limb leads. ST elevation is associated with infarction, and may be preceded by changes indicating ischemia, such as ST depression or inversion of the T waves. Abnormalities can help differentiate the location of an infarct, based on the leads that are affected by changes. Early STEMIs may be preceded by peaked T waves. Other ECG abnormalities relating to complications of acute myocardial infarctions may also be evident, such as atrial or ventricular fibrillation.

=== Imaging ===
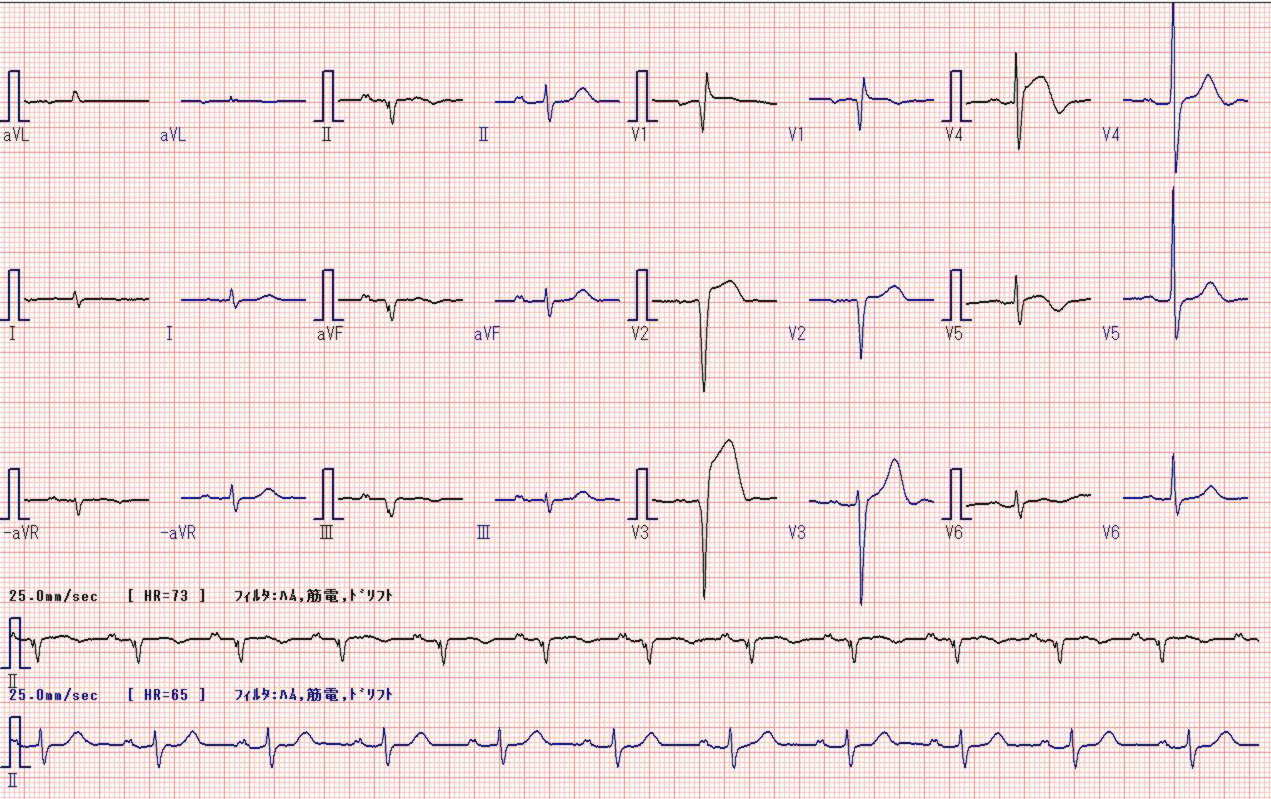
ECG: AMI with ST elevation in V2-4

Noninvasive imaging plays an important role in the diagnosis and characterisation of myocardial infarction. Tests such as chest X-rays can be used to explore and exclude alternate causes of a person's symptoms. Echocardiography may assist in modifying clinical suspicion of ongoing myocardial infarction in patients that can't be ruled out or ruled in following initial ECG and Troponin testing. Myocardial perfusion imaging has no role in the acute diagnostic algorithm; however, it can confirm a clinical suspicion of Chronic Coronary Syndrome when the patient's history, physical examination (including cardiac examination) ECG, and cardiac biomarkers suggest coronary artery disease.

Echocardiography, an ultrasound scan of the heart, is able to visualize the heart, its size, shape, and any abnormal motion of the heart walls as they beat that may indicate a myocardial infarction. The flow of blood can be imaged, and contrast dyes may be given to improve image. Other scans using radioactive contrast include SPECT CT-scans using thallium, sestamibi (MIBI scans) or tetrofosmin; or a PET scan using Fludeoxyglucose or rubidium-82. These nuclear medicine scans can visualize the perfusion of heart muscle. SPECT may also be used to determine viability of tissue, and whether areas of ischemia are inducible.

Medical societies and professional guidelines recommend that the physician confirm a person is at high risk for Chronic Coronary Syndrome before conducting diagnostic non-invasive imaging tests to make a diagnosis, as such tests are unlikely to change management and result in increased costs. Patients who have a normal ECG and who are able to exercise, for example, most likely do not merit routine imaging.

Poor movement of the heart due to an MI as seen on ultrasound

Pulmonary edema due to an MI as seen on ultrasound

=== Differential diagnosis ===
There are many causes of chest pain, which can originate from the heart, lungs, gastrointestinal tract, aorta, and other muscles, bones and nerves surrounding the chest. In addition to myocardial infarction, other causes include angina, insufficient blood supply (ischemia) to the heart muscles without evidence of cell death, gastroesophageal reflux disease; pulmonary embolism, tumors of the lungs, pneumonia, rib fracture, costochondritis, heart failure and other musculoskeletal injuries. Rarer severe differential diagnoses include aortic dissection, esophageal rupture, tension pneumothorax, and pericardial effusion causing cardiac tamponade. The chest pain in an MI may mimic heartburn. Causes of sudden-onset breathlessness generally involve the lungs or heart – including pulmonary edema, pneumonia, allergic reactions and asthma, and pulmonary embolus, acute respiratory distress syndrome and metabolic acidosis. There are many different causes of fatigue, and myocardial infarction is not a common cause.

== Prevention ==
There is a large crossover between the lifestyle and activity recommendations to prevent a myocardial infarction, and those that may be adopted as secondary prevention after an initial myocardial infarction, because of shared risk factors and an aim to reduce atherosclerosis affecting heart vessels. The influenza vaccine also appears to protect against myocardial infarction with a benefit of 15 to 45%.

=== Primary prevention ===
==== Lifestyle ====
Physical activity can reduce the risk of cardiovascular disease, and people at risk are advised to engage in 150 minutes of moderate or 75 minutes of vigorous intensity aerobic exercise a week. Keeping a healthy weight, drinking alcohol within the recommended limits, and quitting smoking reduce the risk of cardiovascular disease.

Substituting unsaturated fats such as olive oil and rapeseed oil instead of saturated fats may reduce the risk of myocardial infarction, although there is not universal agreement. Dietary modifications are recommended by some national authorities, with recommendations including increasing the intake of wholegrain starch, reducing sugar intake (particularly of refined sugar), consuming five portions of fruit and vegetables daily, consuming two or more portions of fish per week, and consuming 4–5 portions of unsalted nuts, seeds, or legumes per week. The dietary pattern with the greatest support is the Mediterranean diet. Vitamins and mineral supplements are of no proven benefit, and neither are plant stanols or sterols.

Public health measures may also act at a population level to reduce the risk of myocardial infarction, for example by reducing unhealthy diets (excessive salt, saturated fat, and trans-fat) including food labeling and marketing requirements as well as requirements for catering and restaurants and stimulating physical activity. This may be part of regional cardiovascular disease prevention programs or through the health impact assessment of regional and local plans and policies.

Most guidelines recommend combining different preventive strategies. A 2015 Cochrane Review found some evidence that such an approach might help with blood pressure, body mass index and waist circumference. However, there was insufficient evidence to show an effect on mortality or actual cardio-vascular events.

==== Medication ====
Statins, drugs that act to lower blood cholesterol, decrease the incidence and mortality rates of myocardial infarctions. They are often recommended in those at an elevated risk of cardiovascular diseases.

Aspirin has been studied extensively in people considered at increased risk of myocardial infarction. Based on numerous studies in different groups (e.g. people with or without diabetes), there does not appear to be a benefit strong enough to outweigh the risk of excessive bleeding. Nevertheless, many clinical practice guidelines continue to recommend aspirin for primary prevention, and some researchers feel that those with very high cardiovascular risk but low risk of bleeding should continue to receive aspirin.

=== Secondary prevention ===
There is a large crossover between the lifestyle and activity recommendations to prevent a myocardial infarction, and those that may be adopted as secondary prevention after an initial myocardial infarct. Recommendations include stopping smoking, a gradual return to exercise, eating a healthy diet, low in saturated fat and low in cholesterol, drinking alcohol within recommended limits, exercising, and trying to achieve a healthy weight. Exercise is both safe and effective even if people have had stents or heart failure, and is recommended to start gradually after 1–2 weeks. Counselling should be provided relating to medications used, and for warning signs of depression. Previous studies suggested a benefit from omega-3 fatty acid supplementation but this has not been confirmed.

==== Medications ====
Following a heart attack, nitrates, when taken for two days, and ACE-inhibitors decrease the risk of death. Other medications include:

Aspirin is continued indefinitely, as well as another antiplatelet agent such as clopidogrel or ticagrelor ("dual antiplatelet therapy" or DAPT) for up to twelve months. If someone has another medical condition that requires anticoagulation (e.g. with warfarin) this may need to be adjusted based on risk of further cardiac events as well as bleeding risk. In those who have had a stent, more than 12 months of clopidogrel plus aspirin does not affect the risk of death.

Beta blocker therapy such as metoprolol or carvedilol is recommended to be started within 24 hours, provided there is no acute heart failure or heart block. The dose should be increased to the highest tolerated. Contrary to most guidelines, the use of beta blockers does not appear to affect the risk of death, possibly because other treatments for MI have improved. When beta blocker medication is given within the first 24–72 hours of a STEMI no lives are saved. However, 1 in 200 people were prevented from a repeat heart attack, and another 1 in 200 from having an abnormal heart rhythm. Additionally, for 1 in 91 the medication causes a temporary decrease in the heart's ability to pump blood.

ACE inhibitor therapy should be started within 24 hours and continued indefinitely at the highest tolerated dose. This is provided there is no evidence of worsening kidney failure, high potassium, low blood pressure, or known narrowing of the renal arteries. Those who cannot tolerate ACE inhibitors may be treated with an angiotensin II receptor antagonist.

Statin therapy has been shown to reduce mortality and subsequent cardiac events and should be commenced to lower LDL cholesterol. Other medications, such as ezetimibe, may also be added with this goal in mind.

Aldosterone antagonists (spironolactone or eplerenone) may be used if there is evidence of left ventricular dysfunction after an MI, ideally after beginning treatment with an ACE inhibitor.

==== Other ====
A defibrillator, an electric device connected to the heart and surgically inserted under the skin, may be recommended. This is particularly if there are any ongoing signs of heart failure, with a low left ventricular ejection fraction and a New York Heart Association grade II or III after 40 days of the infarction. Defibrillators detect potentially fatal arrhythmia and deliver an electrical shock to the person to depolarize a critical mass of the heart muscle.

== Management ==
A myocardial infarction requires immediate medical attention. Treatment aims to preserve as much heart muscle as possible, and to prevent further complications. Treatment depends on whether the myocardial infarction is a STEMI or NSTEMI. Treatment in general aims to unblock blood vessels, reduce blood clot enlargement, reduce ischemia, and modify risk factors with the aim of preventing future MIs. In addition, the main treatment for myocardial infarctions with ECG evidence of ST elevation (STEMI) include thrombolysis or percutaneous coronary intervention, although PCI is also ideally conducted within 1–3 days for NSTEMI. In addition to clinical judgement, risk stratification may be used to guide treatment, such as with the TIMI and GRACE scoring systems.

=== Pain ===
The pain associated with myocardial infarction is often treated with nitroglycerin, a vasodilator, or opioid medications such as morphine. Nitroglycerin (given under the tongue or injected into a vein) may improve blood supply to the heart. It is an important part of therapy for its pain relief effects, though there is no proven benefit to mortality. Morphine or other opioid medications may also be used, and are effective for the pain associated with STEMI. There is poor evidence that morphine shows any benefit to overall outcomes, and there is some evidence of potential harm.

=== Antithrombotics ===
Aspirin, an antiplatelet drug, is given as a loading dose to reduce the clot size and reduce further clotting in the affected artery. It is known to decrease mortality associated with acute myocardial infarction by at least 50%. P2Y12 inhibitors such as clopidogrel, prasugrel and ticagrelor are given concurrently, also as a loading dose, with the dose depending on whether further surgical management or fibrinolysis is planned. Prasugrel and ticagrelor are recommended in European and American guidelines, as they are active more quickly and consistently than clopidogrel. P2Y12 inhibitors are recommended in both NSTEMI and STEMI, including in PCI, with evidence also to suggest improved mortality. Heparins, particularly in the unfractionated form, act at several points in the clotting cascade, help to prevent the enlargement of a clot, and are also given in myocardial infarction, owing to evidence suggesting improved mortality rates. In very high-risk scenarios, inhibitors of the platelet glycoprotein α_{IIb}β_{3a} receptor such as eptifibatide or tirofiban may be used.

There is varying evidence on the mortality benefits in NSTEMI. A 2014 review of P2Y12 inhibitors such as clopidogrel found they do not change the risk of death when given to people with a suspected NSTEMI prior to PCI, nor do heparins change the risk of death. They do decrease the risk of having a further myocardial infarction.

=== Angiogram ===
Inserting a stent to widen the artery

Primary percutaneous coronary intervention (PCI) is the treatment of choice for STEMI if it can be performed in a timely manner, ideally within 90–120 minutes of contact with a medical provider. Some recommend it is also done in NSTEMI within 1–3 days, particularly when considered high-risk. A 2017 review, however, did not find a difference between early versus later PCI in NSTEMI.

PCI involves small probes, inserted through peripheral blood vessels such as the femoral artery or radial artery into the blood vessels of the heart. The probes are then used to identify and clear blockages using small balloons, which are dragged through the blocked segment, dragging away the clot, or the insertion of stents. Coronary artery bypass grafting is only considered when the affected area of heart muscle is large, and PCI is unsuitable, for example with difficult cardiac anatomy. After PCI, people are generally placed on aspirin indefinitely and on dual antiplatelet therapy (generally aspirin and clopidogrel) for at least a year.

=== Fibrinolysis ===
If PCI cannot be performed within 90 to 120 minutes in STEMI then fibrinolysis, preferably within 30 minutes of arrival to hospital, is recommended. If a person has had symptoms for 12 to 24 hours evidence for effectiveness of thrombolysis is less and if they have had symptoms for more than 24 hours it is not recommended. Thrombolysis involves the administration of medication that activates the enzymes that normally dissolve blood clots. These medications include tissue plasminogen activator, reteplase, streptokinase, and tenecteplase. Thrombolysis is not recommended in a number of situations, particularly when associated with a high risk of bleeding or the potential for problematic bleeding, such as active bleeding, past strokes or bleeds into the brain, or severe hypertension. Situations in which thrombolysis may be considered, but with caution, include recent surgery, use of anticoagulants, pregnancy, and proclivity to bleeding. Major risks of thrombolysis are major bleeding and intracranial bleeding. Pre-hospital thrombolysis reduces time to thrombolytic treatment, based on studies conducted in higher income countries; however, it is unclear whether this has an impact on mortality rates.

=== Other ===
In the past, high flow oxygen was recommended for everyone with a possible myocardial infarction. More recently, no evidence was found for routine use in those with normal oxygen levels and there is potential harm from the intervention. Therefore, oxygen is currently only recommended if oxygen levels are found to be low or if someone is in respiratory distress.

If despite thrombolysis there is significant cardiogenic shock, continued severe chest pain, or less than a 50% improvement in ST elevation on the ECG recording after 90 minutes, then rescue PCI is indicated emergently.

Those who have had cardiac arrest may benefit from targeted temperature management with evaluation for implementation of hypothermia protocols. Furthermore, those with cardiac arrest, and ST elevation at any time, should usually have angiography. Aldosterone antagonists appear to be useful in people who have had an STEMI and do not have heart failure.

=== Rehabilitation and exercise ===
Cardiac rehabilitation benefits many who have experienced myocardial infarction, even if there has been substantial heart damage and resultant left ventricular failure. It should start soon after discharge from the hospital. The program may include lifestyle advice, exercise, social support, as well as recommendations about driving, flying, sports participation, stress management, and sexual intercourse. Returning to sexual activity after myocardial infarction is a major concern for most patients, and is an important area to be discussed in the provision of holistic care.

In the short-term, exercise-based cardiovascular rehabilitation programs may reduce the risk of a myocardial infarction, reduces a large number of hospitalizations from all causes, reduces hospital costs, improves health-related quality of life, and has a small effect on all-cause mortality. Longer-term studies indicate that exercise-based cardiovascular rehabilitation programs may reduce cardiovascular mortality and myocardial infarction.

== Prognosis ==
The prognosis after myocardial infarction varies greatly depending on the extent and location of the affected heart muscle, and the development and management of complications. Prognosis is worse with older age and social isolation. Anterior infarcts, persistent ventricular tachycardia or fibrillation, development of heart blocks, and left ventricular impairment are all associated with poorer prognosis. Without treatment, about a quarter of those affected by MI die within minutes and about forty percent within the first month. Morbidity and mortality from myocardial infarction has, however, improved over the years due to earlier and better treatment: in those who have a STEMI in the United States, between 5 and 6 percent die before leaving the hospital and 7 to 18 percent die within a year.

It is unusual for babies to experience a myocardial infarction, but when they do, about half die. In the short-term, neonatal survivors seem to have a normal quality of life.

=== Complications ===
Complications may occur immediately following the myocardial infarction or may take time to develop. Disturbances of heart rhythms, including atrial fibrillation, ventricular tachycardia and fibrillation and heart block can arise as a result of ischemia, cardiac scarring, and infarct location. Stroke is also a risk, either as a result of clots transmitted from the heart during PCI, as a result of bleeding following anticoagulation, or as a result of disturbances in the heart's ability to pump effectively as a result of the infarction. Regurgitation of blood through the mitral valve is possible, particularly if the infarction causes dysfunction of the papillary muscle. Cardiogenic shock as a result of the heart being unable to adequately pump blood may develop, dependent on infarct size, and is most likely to occur within the days following an acute myocardial infarction. Cardiogenic shock is the largest cause of in-hospital mortality. Rupture of the ventricular dividing wall or left ventricular wall may occur within the initial weeks. Dressler's syndrome, a reaction following larger infarcts and a cause of pericarditis is also possible.

Heart failure may develop as a long-term consequence, with an impaired ability of heart muscle to pump, scarring, and an increase in the size of the existing muscle. Aneurysm of the left ventricle myocardium develops in about 10% of MI and is itself a risk factor for heart failure, ventricular arrhythmia, and the development of clots.

Risk factors for complications and death include age, hemodynamic parameters (such as heart failure, cardiac arrest on admission, systolic blood pressure, or Killip class of two or greater), ST-segment deviation, diabetes, serum creatinine, peripheral vascular disease, and elevation of cardiac markers.

== Epidemiology ==
Myocardial infarction is a common presentation of coronary artery disease. The World Health Organization estimated in 2004, that 12.2% of worldwide deaths were from ischemic heart disease; with it being the leading cause of death in high- or middle-income countries and second only to lower respiratory infections in lower-income countries. Worldwide, more than 3 million people have STEMIs and 4 million have NSTEMIs a year. STEMIs occur about twice as often in men as women.

Rates of death from ischemic heart disease (IHD) have slowed or declined in most high-income countries, although cardiovascular disease still accounted for one in three of all deaths in the US in 2008. For example, rates of death from cardiovascular disease have decreased almost a third between 2001 and 2011 in the United States.

In contrast, IHD is becoming a more common cause of death in the developing world. For example, in India, IHD had become the leading cause of death by 2004, accounting for 1.46 million deaths (14% of total deaths) and deaths due to IHD were expected to double during 1985–2015. Globally, disability adjusted life years (DALYs) lost to ischemic heart disease are predicted to account for 5.5% of total DALYs in 2030, making it the second-most-important cause of disability (after unipolar depressive disorder), as well as the leading cause of death by this date.

== Social determinants of health ==
Social determinants such as neighborhood disadvantage, immigration status, lack of social support, social isolation, and access to health services play an important role in myocardial infarction risk and survival. Studies have shown that low socioeconomic status is associated with an increased risk of poorer survival. There are well-documented disparities in myocardial infarction survival by socioeconomic status, race, education, and census-tract-level poverty.

Race: In the U.S. African Americans have a greater burden of myocardial infarction and other cardiovascular events. On a population level, there is a higher overall prevalence of risk factors that are unrecognized and therefore not treated, which places these individuals at a greater likelihood of experiencing adverse outcomes and therefore potentially higher morbidity and mortality. Similarly, South Asians (including South Asians that have migrated to other countries around the world) experience higher rates of acute myocardial infarctions at younger ages, which can be largely explained by a higher prevalence of risk factors at younger ages.

Socioeconomic status: Among individuals who live in the low-socioeconomic (SES) areas, which is close to 25% of the US population, myocardial infarctions (MIs) occurred twice as often compared with people who lived in higher SES areas.

Immigration status: In 2018 many lawfully present immigrants who were eligible for coverage remained uninsured because immigrant families faced a range of enrollment barriers, including fear, confusion about eligibility policies, difficulty navigating the enrollment process, and language and literacy challenges. Uninsured undocumented immigrants are ineligible for coverage options due to their immigration status.

Health care access: Lack of health insurance and financial concerns about accessing care were associated with delays in seeking emergency care for acute myocardial infarction which can have significant, adverse consequences on patient outcomes.

Education: Researchers found that compared to people with graduate degrees, those with lower educational attainment appeared to have a higher risk of heart attack, dying from a cardiovascular event, and overall death.

== Society and culture ==
Depictions of heart attacks in popular media often include collapsing or loss of consciousness which are not common symptoms; these depictions contribute to widespread misunderstanding about the symptoms of myocardial infarctions, which in turn contributes to people not getting care when they should.

== Legal implications ==
At common law, in general, a myocardial infarction is a disease but may sometimes be an injury. This can create coverage issues in the administration of no-fault insurance schemes such as workers' compensation. In general, a heart attack is not covered; however, it may be a work-related injury if it results, for example, from unusual emotional stress or unusual exertion. In addition, in some jurisdictions, heart attacks had by persons in particular occupations such as police officers may be classified as line-of-duty injuries by statute or policy. In some countries or states, a person having had an MI may be prevented from participating in activity that puts other people's lives at risk, for example driving a car or flying an airplane.
