= Thrombolysis =

Breakdown (lysis) of blood clots formed in blood vessels, using medication

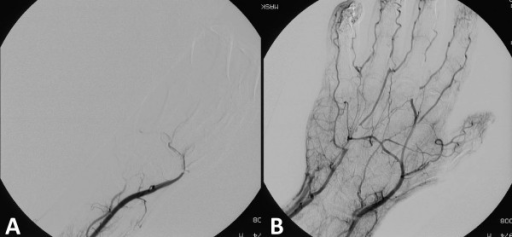
- Angiograph before and after thrombolytic therapy in a case of acute limb ischemia of the hand.
- Other names: Fibrinolytic therapy
- MedlinePlus: 007089
- eMedicine: 811234

Thrombolysis, also called fibrinolytic therapy, is the breakdown (lysis) of blood clots formed in blood vessels, using medication. It is used in ST elevation myocardial infarction, stroke, and in cases of severe venous thromboembolism (massive pulmonary embolism or extensive deep vein thrombosis).

Thrombolytic medications pose a risk of serious bleeding, and in some situations thrombolysis may therefore be unsuitable. Thrombolysis can also play an important part in reperfusion therapy in blocked arteries.

== Medical uses ==
Diseases where thrombolysis is used:

- ST elevation myocardial infarction: Large trials have shown that mortality can be reduced using thrombolysis (particularly fibrinolysis) in treating heart attacks. It works by stimulating secondary fibrinolysis by plasmin through infusion of analogs of tissue plasminogen activator (tPA), the protein that normally activates plasmin. Percutaneous coronary intervention (PCI), a minimally invasive procedure in which coronary stents are deployed to open obstructed arteries is superior to fibrinolytic therapy, but fibrinolysis is still recommended for use in healthcare settings where PCI is not available in a timely manner.
- Stroke: Thrombolysis reduces major disability or death when given within 3 hours (or perhaps even 6 hours) of ischaemic stroke onset when there are no contraindications to treatment.
- Massive pulmonary embolism. For the treatment of a massive pulmonary embolism, catheter-directed therapy is a safer and more effective alternative to systemic thrombolysis. This involves the injecting of drugs directly into the clot.
- Severe deep vein thrombosis (DVT), such as phlegmasia cerulea dolens, which threatens limb loss, or iliofemoral DVT, where clots involve at a minimum the common iliac vein
- Acute limb ischemia
- Clotted hemothorax

Thrombolysis is usually intravenous. It may also be used directly into the affected blood vessel during an angiogram (intra-arterial thrombolysis), e.g., when patients present with stroke beyond three hours or in severe deep vein thrombosis (catheter-directed thrombolysis).

Thrombolysis is performed by many types of medical specialists, including interventional radiologists, vascular surgeons, cardiologists, interventional neuroradiologists, and neurosurgeons. In some countries such as the United States, emergency medical technicians may administer thrombolytics for heart attacks in prehospital settings, by on-line medical direction. In countries with more extensive and independent qualifications, prehospital thrombolysis (fibrinolysis) may be initiated by the emergency care practitioner (ECP). Other countries which employ ECP's include, South Africa, the United Kingdom, and New Zealand. Prehospital thrombolysis is always the result of a risk-benefit calculation of the heart attack, thrombolysis risks, and primary percutaneous coronary intervention (pPCI) availability.

== Contraindications ==
Thrombolysis is not without risks. Therefore, clinicians must select patients who are to be best suited for the procedure, and those who have the least risk of having a fatal complication. An absolute contraindication is in itself enough to avoid thrombolysis, while a relative contraindication needs to be considered in relation to the overall clinical situation.

=== Myocardial infarction ===
Absolute contraindications:

- Any previous history of hemorrhagic stroke.
- History of ischemic stroke within 3 months.
- History of stroke, dementia, or central nervous system damage within 1 year
- Head trauma within 3 weeks or brain surgery within 6 months
- Known intracranial neoplasm (primary or metastatic)
- Suspected aortic dissection
- Internal bleeding within 6 weeks
- Active bleeding or known bleeding disorder
- Traumatic cardiopulmonary resuscitation within 3 weeks

Relative contraindications:

- Prior ischemic stroke not within past 3 months.
- Oral anticoagulant therapy
- Acute pancreatitis
- Pregnancy or within 1 week postpartum
- Active peptic ulceration
- Transient ischemic attack within 6 months
- Dementia
- Infective endocarditis
- Active cavitating pulmonary tuberculosis
- Advanced liver disease
- Intracardiac thrombi
- Uncontrolled hypertension (systolic blood pressure >180 mm Hg, diastolic blood pressure >110 mm Hg)
- Puncture of noncompressible blood vessel within 2 weeks
- Previous streptokinase therapy
- Major surgery, trauma, or bleeding within 2 weeks

=== Stroke ===
Absolute contraindications:

- Uncertainty about time of stroke onset (e.g. patients awakening from sleep).
- Coma or severe obtundation with fixed eye deviation and complete hemiplegia.
- Hypertension: systolic blood pressure ≥ 185mmHg; or diastolic blood pressure >110mmHg on repeated measures prior to study (if reversed, patient can be treated).
- Clinical presentation suggestive of subarachnoid haemorrhage even if the CT scan is normal.
- Presumed septic embolus.
- Patient having received a heparin medication within the last 48 hours and has an elevated Activated Prothrombin Time (APTT) or has a known hereditary or acquired haemorrhagic diathesis
- INR >1.7
- Known advanced liver disease, advanced right heart failure, or anticoagulation, and INR > 1.5 (no need to wait for INR result in the absence of the former three conditions).
- Known platelet count <100,000 uL.
- Serum glucose is < 2.8 mmol/L or >22.0 mmol/L.

Relative contraindications:

- Severe neurological impairment with NIHSS score >22.
- Age >80 years.
- CT evidence of extensive middle cerebral artery (MCA) territory infarction (sulcal effacement or blurring of grey-white junction in greater than 1/3 of MCA territory).
- Stroke or serious head trauma within the past three months where the risks of bleeding are considered to outweigh the benefits of therapy.
- Major surgery within the last 14 days (consider intra-arterial thrombolysis).
- Patient has a known history of intracranial haemorrhage, subarachnoid haemorrhage, known intracranial arteriovenous malformation or previously known intracranial neoplasm
- Suspected recent (within 30 days) myocardial infarction.
- Recent (within 30 days) biopsy of a parenchymal organ or surgery that, in the opinion of the responsible clinician, would increase the risk of unmanageable (e.g. uncontrolled by local pressure) bleeding.
- Recent (within 30 days) trauma with internal injuries or ulcerative wounds.
- Gastrointestinal or urinary tract haemorrhage within the last 30 days or any active or recent haemorrhage that, in the opinion of the responsible clinician, would increase the risk of unmanageable (e.g. by local pressure) bleeding.
- Arterial puncture at non-compressible site within the last 7 days.
- Concomitant serious, advanced or terminal illness or any other condition that, in the opinion of the responsible clinician would pose an unacceptable risk.
- Minor or Rapidly improving deficit.
- Seizure: If the presenting neurological deficit is deemed due to a seizure.
- Pregnancy is not an absolute contraindication. Consider intra-arterial thrombolysis.

== Side-effects ==
Hemorrhagic stroke is a rare but serious complication of thrombolytic therapy. If a patient has had thrombolysis before, an allergy against the thrombolytic drug may have developed (especially after streptokinase). If the symptoms are mild, the infusion is stopped and the patient is commenced on an antihistamine before infusion is recommenced. Anaphylaxis generally requires immediate cessation of thrombolysis.

== Agents ==
Thrombolysis therapy uses thrombolytic drugs that dissolve blood clots. Most of these drugs target fibrin (one of the main constituent of blood clots) and are therefore called fibrinolytics. All currently approved thrombolytic drugs are biologics, either derived from Streptococcus species, or, more recently, using recombinant biotechnology whereby tPA is manufactured using cell culture, resulting in a recombinant tissue plasminogen activator or rtPA.

Some fibrinolytics are:

- Streptokinase (Kabikinase)
- Urokinase
- Recombinant tissue plasminogen activators (rtPA)
  - Alteplase (Activase or Actilyse)
  - Reteplase (Retavase)
  - Tenecteplase
  - Anistreplase (Eminase)

== Catheter-directed thrombolysis ==
A 2023 meta-analysis of 44 studies compared treatments for pulmonary embolism including thrombolytic therapy delivered through a catheter. Catheter-directed thrombolysis (CDT) methods included fragmentation and ultrasound use. CDT was associated with better outcomes than anticoagulation alone or systemic thrombolysis, but the studies were mostly small and observational.

In people who receive CDT, there is a risk of hemorrhage as a side effect. Scientists have studied whether measuring fibrinogen in blood can be used as a biomarker to predict hemorrhage. As of 2017 it was not known if this works or not.

== Research ==
Researchers showed a 10-fold variation in the proportion of patients who received thrombolysis after stroke in England and Wales, ranging from 1 in 50 (2%) to 1 in 4 (24%). The team also showed that most of the variation was explained by hospital processes (such as how quickly people can have a brain scan) and in doctors' decision-making (who they think should or should not receive thrombolysis) rather than knowledge of the time of stroke.

Prospective, randomized clinical trials to evaluate the utility of catheter-directed thrombolysis in pulmonary embolism include HI-PEITHO (Higher-Risk Pulmonary Embolism Thrombolysis).

== See also ==
- TIMI – Thrombolysis In Myocardial Infarction (study group)
