= ZC3HC1 =

Protein-coding gene in the species Homo sapiens

Identifiers
- Aliases: ZC3HC1, NIPA, HSPC216, zinc finger C3HC-type containing 1
- External IDs: MGI: 1916023; GeneCards: ZC3HC1

Gene location (Human)
Chr.	Chromosome 7 (human)
Band	7q32.2	Start	130,018,287 bp
Band	7q32.2	End	130,051,451 bp

Gene location (Mouse)
Chr.	Chromosome 6 (mouse)
Band	6|6 A3.3	Start	30,366,379 bp
Band	6|6 A3.3	End	30,391,027 bp
RNA expression pattern
Bgee	Human / Mouse (ortholog); Top expressed in: tibialis anterior muscle; oocyte; deltoid muscle; secondary oocyte; muscle of thigh; quadriceps femoris muscle; gastrocnemius muscle; gonad; vastus lateralis muscle; Skeletal muscle tissue of rectus abdominis / Top expressed in: otic placode; morula; morula; saccule; otic vesicle; mandibular prominence; maxillary prominence; epiblast; ventricular zone; Gonadal ridge; More reference expression data
BioGPS	n/a
Gene ontology
Molecular function	zinc ion binding; protein binding; protein kinase binding; metal ion binding
Cellular component	nuclear membrane; nucleus
Biological process	cell cycle; negative regulation of extrinsic apoptotic signaling pathway in absence of ligand; protein ubiquitination; cell division
Sources:Amigo / QuickGO
Orthologs
Databases	NCBI: entry; OMA: entry
Species	Human	Mouse
Entrez	51530	232679
Ensembl	ENSG00000091732	ENSMUSG00000039130
UniProt	Q86WB0	Q80YV2
RefSeq (mRNA)	NM_001282190; NM_001282191; NM_016478; NM_001363701	NM_172735; NM_001311086
RefSeq (protein)	NP_001269119; NP_001269120; NP_057562; NP_001350630	NP_001298015; NP_766323
Location (UCSC)	Chr 7: 130.02 – 130.05 Mb	Chr 6: 30.37 – 30.39 Mb
PubMed search
- Wikidata
View/Edit Human	View/Edit Mouse

Nuclear-interacting partner of ALK (NIPA), also known as zinc finger C3HC-type protein 1 (ZC3HC1), is a protein that in humans is encoded by the ZC3HC1 gene on chromosome 7. It is ubiquitously expressed in many tissues and cell types though exclusively expressed in the nuclear subcellular location. NIPA is a skp1 cullin F-box (SCF)-type ubiquitin E3 ligase (SCFNIPA) complex protein involved in regulating entry into mitosis. The ZC3HC1 gene also contains one of 27 SNPs associated with increased risk of coronary artery disease.

== Structure ==
=== Gene ===
The ZC3HC1 gene resides on chromosome 7 at the band 7q32.2 and includes 14 exons.

=== Protein ===
NIPA is a 60-kDa E3 ligase that contains one C3HC-type zinc finger and one F-box-like region. Moreover, a 50-residue region (amino acids 352-402) at its C-terminal serves as the nuclear translocation signal (NLS sequence) while a 96-residue region (amino acids 306-402) is proposed to serve as the phosphotyrosine-binding domain. NIPA is one component of the nuclear SCFNIPA complex, and phosphorylation of NIPA at three serine residues, Ser-354, Ser-359 and Ser-395, has been demonstrated to inactivate the complex as a whole.

== Function ==
NIPA is broadly expressed in the human tissues, with the highest expression in heart, skeletal muscle, and testis. It is a human F-box protein that defines an SCF-type ubiquitin E3 ligase, the formation of which is regulated by cell-cycle-dependent phosphorylation of NIPA. Cyclin B1, essential in the entry into mitosis, is targeted by SCFNIPA in interphase. Phosphorylation of NIPA occurs in G2 phase, results in dissociation of NIPA from the SCF core, and has been proven critical for proper G2/M transition. Oscillating ubiquitination of nuclear cyclin B1 driven by the SCFNIPA complex contributes to the timing of mitotic entry. NIPA is also reported to delay apoptosis and the localization of NIPA is required for this antiapoptotic function.

== Clinical relevance ==
In humans, NIPA has been implicated in cardiovascular diseases by genome-wide association (GWAS) studies. Specifically, a single-nucleotide polymorphism (SNP) situated in ZC3HC1 has been shown to predict coronary artery disease. This prediction appears to be independent of traditional risk factors for cardiovascular disease such as high cholesterol levels, high blood pressure, obesity, smoking and diabetes mellitus, which are primary targets of current treatments for coronary artery disease. Therefore, studying the function of this gene may identify novel pathways contributing to coronary artery disease that result in the development of novel therapeutics.

=== Clinical marker ===
At the coronary artery disease-associated locus 7q32.2, only a single SNP (rs11556924) is associated with coronary artery disease risk, with no other variants in strong linkage disequilibrium. The rs11556924 SNP in the ZC3HC1 gene results in an arginine-histidine polymorphism at amino acid residue 363 in NIPA. Furthermore, rs11556924 has also been associated with altered carotid intima-media thickness in patients with rheumatoid arthritis and with altered risk of atrial fibrillation.

Additionally, a multi-locus genetic risk score study based on a combination of 27 loci, including the ZC3HC1 gene, identified individuals at increased risk for both incident and recurrent coronary artery disease events, as well as an enhanced clinical benefit from statin therapy. The study was based on a community cohort study (the Malmo Diet and Cancer study) and four additional randomized controlled trials of primary prevention cohorts (JUPITER and ASCOT) and secondary prevention cohorts (CARE and PROVE IT-TIMI 22).
