= Tenecteplase =

Pharmaceutical drug

Clinical data
- Trade names: Metalyse
- AHFS/Drugs.com: Monograph
- MedlinePlus: a625007
- License data: US DailyMed: Tenecteplase
- Routes of administration: Intravenous
- Drug class: Tissue plasminogen activator
- ATC code: B01AD11 (WHO)

Legal status
- Legal status: US: ℞-only; In general: ℞ (Prescription only)

Pharmacokinetic data
- Excretion: Liver

Identifiers
- IUPAC name: Human tissue plasminogen activator
- CAS Number: 191588-94-0
- DrugBank: DB00031
- ChemSpider: none
- UNII: WGD229O42W
- KEGG: D02837

Chemical and physical data
- Formula: C_{2561}H_{3919}N_{747}O_{781}S_{40}
- Molar mass: 58951.37 g·mol^{−1}

Tenecteplase, sold under the brand name Metalyse among others, is an enzyme used as a thrombolytic drug.

Tenecteplase is a tissue plasminogen activator (tPA) produced by recombinant DNA technology using an established mammalian cell line (Chinese hamster ovary cells). Tenecteplase is a 527 amino acid glycoprotein developed by introducing the following modifications to the complementary DNA for natural human tPA: a substitution of threonine 103 with asparagine, and a substitution of asparagine 117 with glutamine, both within the kringle 1 domain, and a tetra-alanine substitution at amino acids 296–299 in the protease domain.

Tenecteplase was approved for medical use in the United States in June 2000.

== Medical uses ==
Tenecteplase is indicated to reduce the risk of death associated with acute ST elevation myocardial infarction and acute ischemic stroke.

== Pharmacokinetics ==
The initial volume of distribution approximates plasma volume.

Tenecteplase is primarily metabolised through the liver.

Elimination is biphasic, with an initial half-life of 20–24 minutes and a terminal half-life of 90–130 minutes. Average plasma clearance ranges from 99–119 mL/minute.

== Gallery ==
Here is TNK-tPA. It is very similar to t-PA, but the glycosylation occurring in Kringle 1 is manipulated. The mutation T103N means that glycosylation occurs at that point. The mutation N117Q means that the high mannose sugar residue is absent at that point.

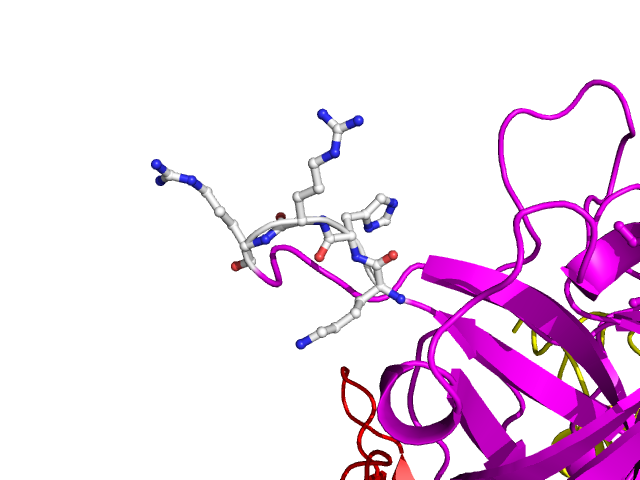
In human t-PA, the amino acids at position 296–299 are lysine, histidine, and two arginines.

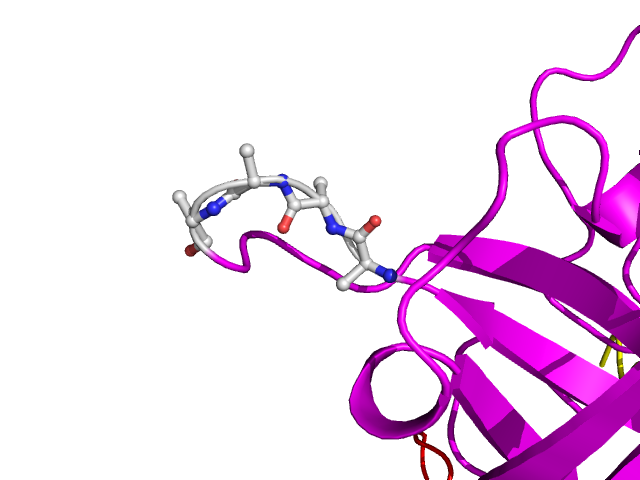
In TNK-tPA, these amino acids have been replaced by four alanines. This mutation is responsible for increased resistance to PAI-1.

== Research ==
Researchers at Newcastle University in Australia say they have had a significant breakthrough in treating stroke patients using the commonly used drug. The findings were published in the New England Journal of Medicine. Though safety has been established through previous clinical trials, there is ongoing debate about whether this is an effective treatment for ischemic stroke, and significant ongoing discussion between emergency physicians, neurologists and pharmacists about whether this treatment should be used for that indication.

The American Heart Association/American Stroke Association 2019 update to the 2018 guidelines for the Early Management of Acute Ischemic Stroke supports considering tenecteplase over alteplase in patients without contraindication to intravenous thrombolytics.
