= Tissue-type plasminogen activator =

Protein involved in the breakdown of blood clots

PLAT
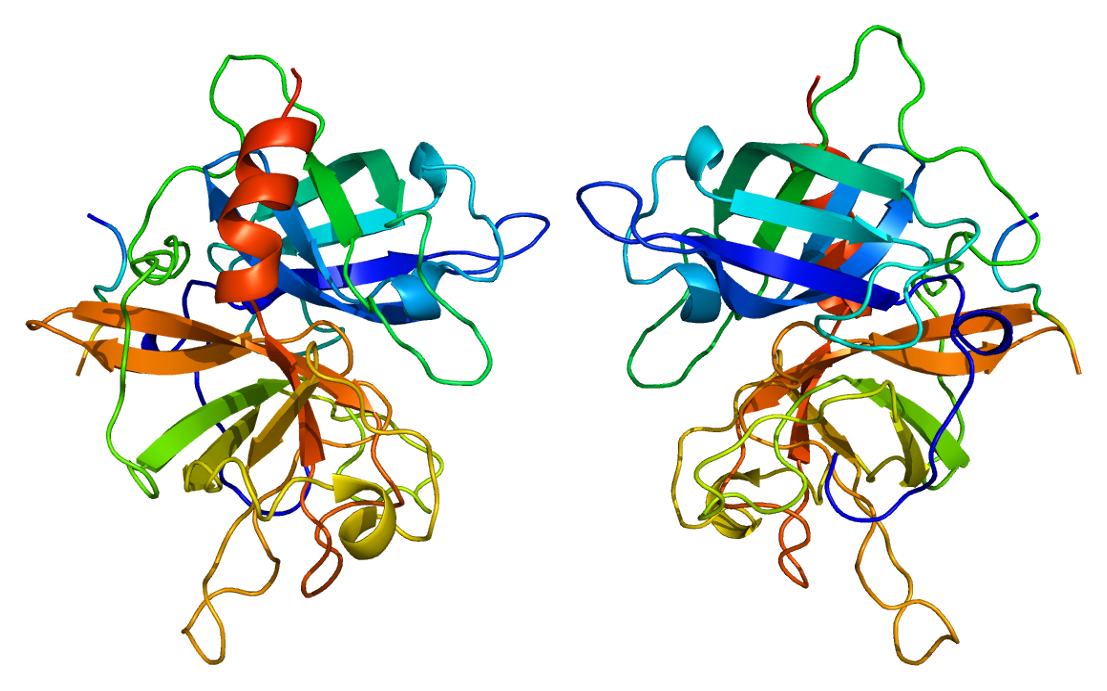

Identifiers
- Aliases: PLAT, T-PA, TPA, plasminogen activator, tissue type
- External IDs: OMIM: 173370; MGI: 97610; GeneCards: PLAT
Available structures
PDB	Ortholog search: PDBe RCSB
PDB	List of PDB id codes 1A5H, 1BDA, 1PK2, 1PML, 1RTF, 1TPG, 1TPK, 1TPM, 1TPN, 5BRR
Enzyme activity
EC #	BRENDA	ExPASy	KEGG	MetaCyc
3.4.21.68	↗	↗	↗	↗

Gene location (Human)
Chr.	Chromosome 8 (human)
Band	8p11.21	Start	42,174,718 bp
Band	8p11.21	End	42,207,709 bp

Gene location (Mouse)
Chr.	Chromosome 8 (mouse)
Band	8 A2|8 11.42 cM	Start	23,247,743 bp
Band	8 A2|8 11.42 cM	End	23,272,860 bp
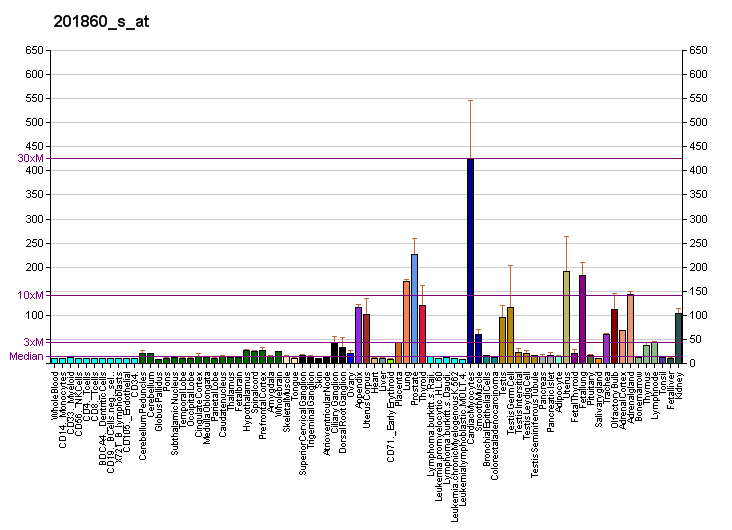
RNA expression pattern
Bgee	Human / Mouse (ortholog); Top expressed in: stromal cell of endometrium; pancreatic ductal cell; urethra; vena cava; mucosa of urinary bladder; lactiferous duct; pylorus; gallbladder; left uterine tube; cardia / Top expressed in: primary oocyte; secondary oocyte; saccule; utricle; molecular layer of cerebellar cortex; renal corpuscle; zygote; optic nerve; sciatic nerve; otic placode; More reference expression data
BioGPS	More reference expression data
Gene ontology
Molecular function	peptidase activity; phosphoprotein binding; serine-type peptidase activity; serine-type endopeptidase activity; signaling receptor binding; hydrolase activity; protein binding
Cellular component	cytoplasm; extracellular matrix; apical part of cell; secretory granule; extracellular region; cell surface; extracellular exosome; extracellular space; collagen-containing extracellular matrix; Schaffer collateral - CA1 synapse; glutamatergic synapse
Biological process	negative regulation of proteolysis; response to hypoxia; fibrinolysis; blood coagulation; smooth muscle cell migration; proteolysis; platelet-derived growth factor receptor signaling pathway; plasminogen activation; trans-synaptic signaling by BDNF, modulating synaptic transmission
Sources:Amigo / QuickGO
Orthologs
Databases	NCBI: entry; OMA: entry
Species	Human	Mouse
Entrez	5327	18791
Ensembl	ENSG00000104368	ENSMUSG00000031538
UniProt	P00750	P11214
RefSeq (mRNA)	NM_033011; NM_000930; NM_000931; NM_001319189	NM_008872
RefSeq (protein)	NP_000921; NP_001306118; NP_127509	NP_032898
Location (UCSC)	Chr 8: 42.17 – 42.21 Mb	Chr 8: 23.25 – 23.27 Mb
PubMed search
- Wikidata
View/Edit Human	View/Edit Mouse

Tissue-type plasminogen activator, short name tPA, is a protein that facilitates the breakdown of blood clots. It acts as an enzyme to convert plasminogen into its active form plasmin, the major enzyme responsible for clot breakdown. It is a serine protease (EC 3.4.21.68) found on endothelial cells lining the blood vessels. Human tPA is encoded by the PLAT gene, and has a molecular weight of ~70 kDa in the single-chain form.

tPA can be manufactured using recombinant biotechnology techniques, producing types of recombinant tissue plasminogen activator (rtPA) such as alteplase, reteplase, and tenecteplase. These drugs are used in clinical medicine to treat embolic or thrombotic stroke, but they are contraindicated and dangerous in cases of hemorrhagic stroke and head trauma. The antidote for tPA in case of toxicity is aminocaproic acid.

== Medical uses ==
tPA is used in some cases of diseases that feature blood clots, such as pulmonary embolism, myocardial infarction, and stroke, in a medical treatment called thrombolysis. The most common use is for ischemic stroke. It can either be administered systemically, in the case of acute myocardial infarction, acute ischemic stroke, and most cases of acute massive pulmonary embolism, or administered through an arterial catheter directly to the site of occlusion in the case of peripheral arterial thrombi and thrombi in the proximal deep veins of the leg.

=== Ischemic stroke ===
==== Statistics ====
There have been 12 large scale, high-quality trials of rtPA in acute ischemic stroke. A meta-analysis of these trials concluded that rtPA given within 6 hours of a stroke significantly increased the odds of being alive and independent at final follow-up, particularly in patients treated within 3 hours. However a significant mortality rate was noted, mostly from intracranial haemorrhage at 7 days, but later mortality was not significant amongst treated and non-treated patients.

It has been suggested that if tPA is effective in ischemic stroke, it must be administered as early as possible after the onset of stroke symptoms, given that patients present to an ED in a timely manner. Many national guidelines including the AHA have interpreted this cohort of studies as suggesting that there are specific subgroups who may benefit from tPA and thus recommend its use within a limited time window after the event. Protocol guidelines require its use intravenously within the first three hours of the event, after which its detriments may outweigh its benefits.

For example, the Canadian Stroke Network guideline states "All patients with disabling acute ischemic stroke who can be treated within 4.5 hours of symptom onset should be evaluated without delay to determine their eligibility for treatment" with tPA. Delayed presentation to the ED leads to decreased eligibility; as few as 3% of people qualify for this treatment. Similarly in the United States, the window of administration used to be 3 hours from onset of symptoms, but the newer guidelines also recommend use up to 4.5 hours after symptom onset, depending on the patient's presentation, past medical history, current comorbidities and medication usage. tPA appears to show benefit not only for large artery occlusions but also for lacunar strokes. Since tPA dissolves blood clots, there is risk of hemorrhage with its use.

==== Administration criteria ====
Use of tPA in the United States in treatment of patients who are eligible for its use, have no contraindications, and arrival at the treating facility less than 3 hours after onset of symptoms, is reported to have doubled from 2003 to 2011. Use on patients with mild deficits, of nonwhite race/ethnicity, and oldest old age increased. However, many patients who were eligible for treatment were not treated.

tPA has also been given to patients with acute ischemic stroke above age 90 years old. Although a small fraction of patients 90 years and above treated with tPA for acute ischemic stroke recover, most patients have a poor 30-day functional outcome or die. Nonagenarians may do as well as octogenarians following treatment with IV-tPA for acute ischemic stroke. In addition, people with frostbite treated with tPA had fewer amputations than those not treated with tPA.

==== General consensus on use ====
There is consensus amongst stroke specialists that tPA is the standard of care for eligible stroke patients, and benefits outweigh the risks. There is significant debate mainly in the emergency medicine community regarding recombinant tPA's effectiveness in ischemic stroke. The NNT Group on evidence-based medicine concluded that it was inappropriate to combine these twelve trials into a single analysis, because of substantial clinical heterogeneity (i.e., variations in study design, setting, and population characteristics). Examining each study individually, the NNT group noted that two of these studies showed benefit to patients given tPA (and that, using analytical methods that they think flawed); four studies showed harm and had to be stopped before completion; and the remaining studies showed neither benefit nor harm. On the basis of this evidence, the NNT Group recommended against the use of tPA in acute ischaemic stroke. The NNT Group notes that the case for the 3-hour time window arises largely from analysis of two trials: NINDS-2 and subgroup results from IST-3. "However, presuming that early (0-3h) administration is better than later administration (3-4.5h or 4.5-6h) the subgroup results of IST-3 suggest an implausible biological effect in which early administration is beneficial, 3-4.5h administration is harmful, and 4.5-6h administration is again beneficial." Indeed, even the original publication of the IST-3 trial found that time-window effects were not significant predictors of outcome (p=0.61). In the UK, concerns by stroke specialists have led to a review by the Medicines and Healthcare products Regulatory Agency.

=== Pulmonary embolism ===
Pulmonary embolism (blood clots that have moved to the lung arteries) is usually treated with heparin generally followed by warfarin. If pulmonary embolism causes severe instability due to high pressure on the heart ("massive PE") and leads to low blood pressure, recombinant tPA is recommended.

=== Recombinant tissue plasminogen activators (r-tPA) ===
tPA was first produced by recombinant DNA techniques at Genentech in 1982.

Tissue-type plasminogen activators were initially identified and isolated from mammalian tissues after which a cDNA library was established with the use of reverse transcriptase and mRNA from human melanoma cells. The aforementioned mRNA was isolated using antibody based immunoprecipitation. The resulting cDNA library was subsequently screened via sequence analysis and compared to a whole genome library for confirmation of specific protein isolation and accuracy. cDNA was cloned into a synthetic plasmid and initially expressed in E. coli cells, followed by yeast cells with successful results confirmed via sequencing before attempting in mammalian cells. The transformants were selected with the use of methotrexate. Methotrexate strengthens selection by inhibiting DHFR activity which then compels the cells to express more DHFR (exogenous) and consequently more recombinant protein to survive. The highly active transformants were subsequently placed in an industrial fermenter. The tPA which was then secreted into the culture medium was isolated and collected for therapeutic use. For pharmaceutical purposes, tPA was the first pharmaceutical drug produced synthetically with the use of mammalian cells, specifically Chinese hamster ovarian cells (CHO). Recombinant tPA is commonly referred to as r-tPA and sold under multiple brand names.

Commercial r-tPA
Product Name	Notes
Activase (Alteplase)	FDA-approved for treatment of myocardial infarction with ST-elevation (STEMI), acute ischemic stroke (AIS), acute massive pulmonary embolism, and central venous access devices (CVAD).
Reteplase	FDA-approved for acute myocardial infarction, where it has more convenient administration and faster thrombolysis than alteplase. This is because it is a second generation engineered TPA, hence its half life is up to 20 minutes which allows it to be administered as a bolus injection rather than an infusion like Alteplase.
Tenecteplase	Indicated in acute myocardial infarction, showing fewer bleeding complications but otherwise similar mortality rates after one year compared to Alteplase.. FDA-approved for acute ischemic stroke (AIS) in February 2025

== Interactions ==
Tissue plasminogen activator has been shown to interact with:

- Fibrinogen alpha chain
- LRP1
- SERPINI1

== Function ==
A simplified illustration demonstrates clot breakdown (fibrinolysis), with blue arrows denoting stimulation, and red arrows inhibition.

tPA and plasmin are the key enzymes of the fibrinolytic pathway in which tPA-mediated plasmin generation occurs.

tPA cleaves the zymogen plasminogen at its Arg561 - Val562 peptide bond, into the serine protease plasmin.

Increased enzymatic activity causes hyperfibrinolysis, which manifests as excessive bleeding and/or an increase of the vascular permeability. Decreased activity leads to hypofibrinolysis, which can result in thrombosis or embolism.

In patients with ischemic strokes, decreased tPA activity was reported to be associated with an increase in plasma P-selectin concentration.

Tissue plasminogen activator also plays a role in cell migration and tissue remodeling.

=== Physiology and regulation ===
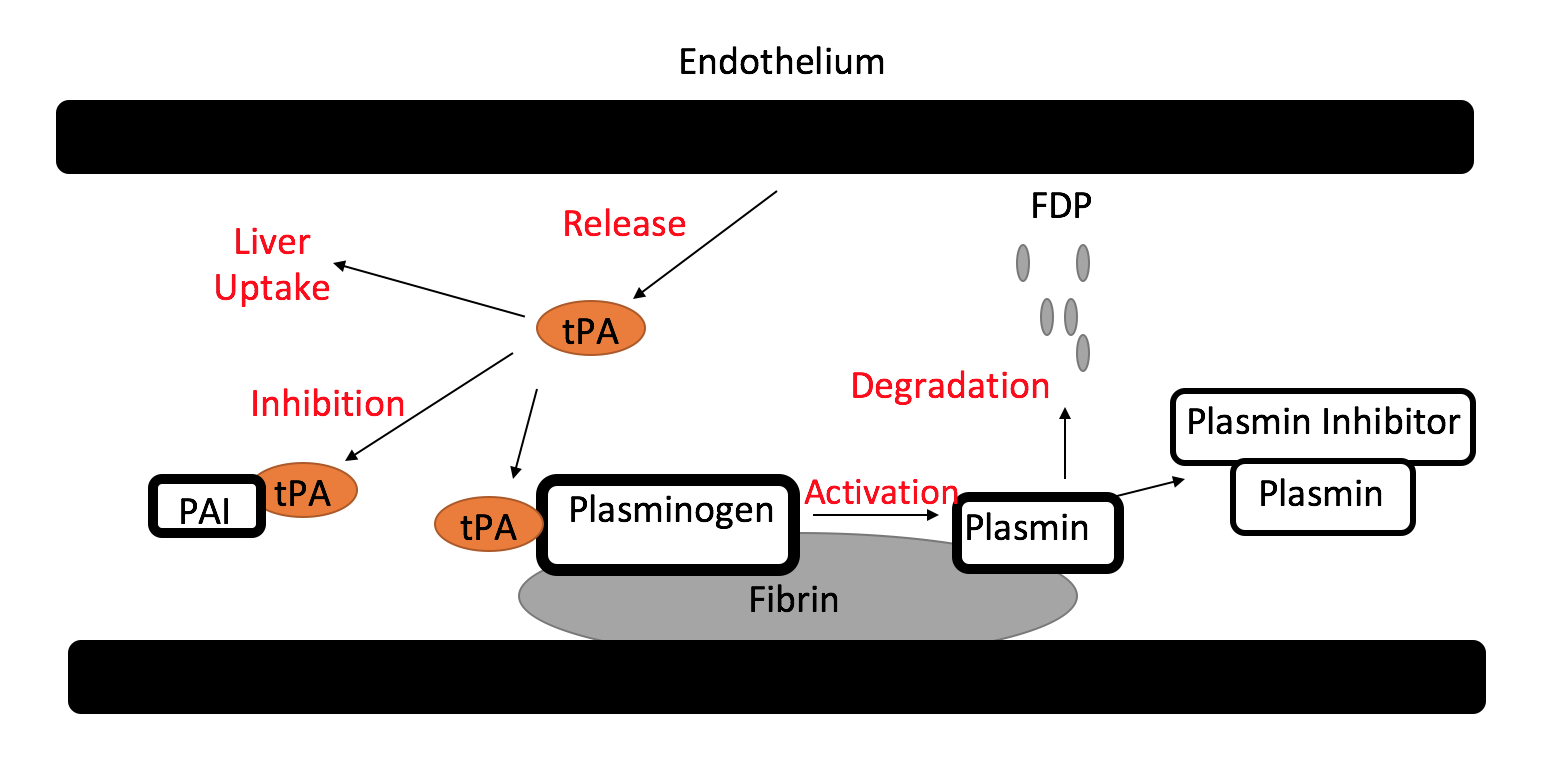
In vivo mechanism of action of tPA within the fibrinolytic system. tPA can go one of three ways in the body; (1) uptaken by the liver and cleared through receptors therein, (2) inhibited by a plasminogen activator inhibitor (PAI) and subsequently cleared from the liver, or (3) through the activation of plasminogen to plasmin for degradation to result in fibrin degradation product.

Once in the body, tPA has can cause the desired thrombolytic activity (see figure), or be inactivated and removed. In the bloodstream tPA has a half-life of 4 to 6 minutes. tPA can be bound by a plasminogen activator inhibitor, resulting in inactivation of its activity. The protein is then removed from the bloodstream by the liver. One of the specific receptors responsible for this processes is a protein known as the LDL Receptor-Related Protein (LRP1), which clears tPA which is bound to the Plasminogen Activator Inhibitor 1 (PAI-1). However, when present in a high enough concentration to counteract the effects of plasminogen activator inhibitor, tPA can bind plasminogen, cleaving off the bound plasmin from it. Plasmin, another type of protease, can either be bound by a plasmin inhibitor, or work to degrade fibrin clots, which is the main therapeutic pathway.

=== Synaptic plasticity ===
tPA is known to participate in some forms of synaptic plasticity, in particular long-term depression and consequently mediate some aspects of memory.

== Genetics ==
Tissue plasminogen activator is a protein encoded by the PLAT gene, which is located on chromosome 8. The primary transcript produced by this gene undergoes alternative splicing, producing three distinct messenger RNAs.

== Gallery ==
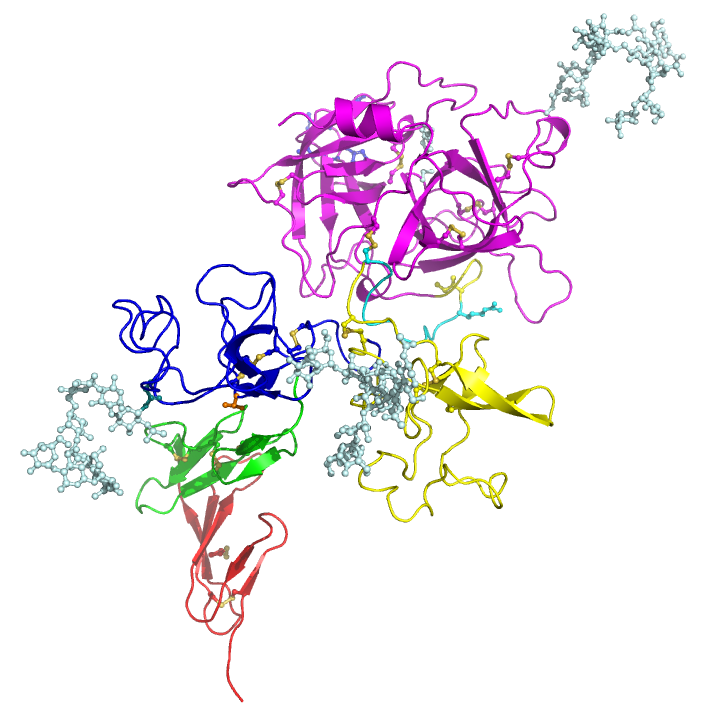
A theoretical full-length model of t-PA. The finger domain is in red, the EGF-like domain in green, the kringle 1 and 2 domains in blue and yellow respectively, and the serine protease domain in magenta.

A 360 view of t-PA showing its structure.

== See also ==
- Streptokinase
- Ultrasound-enhanced systemic thrombolysis
