= Feline arterial thromboembolism =

Domestic cat disease

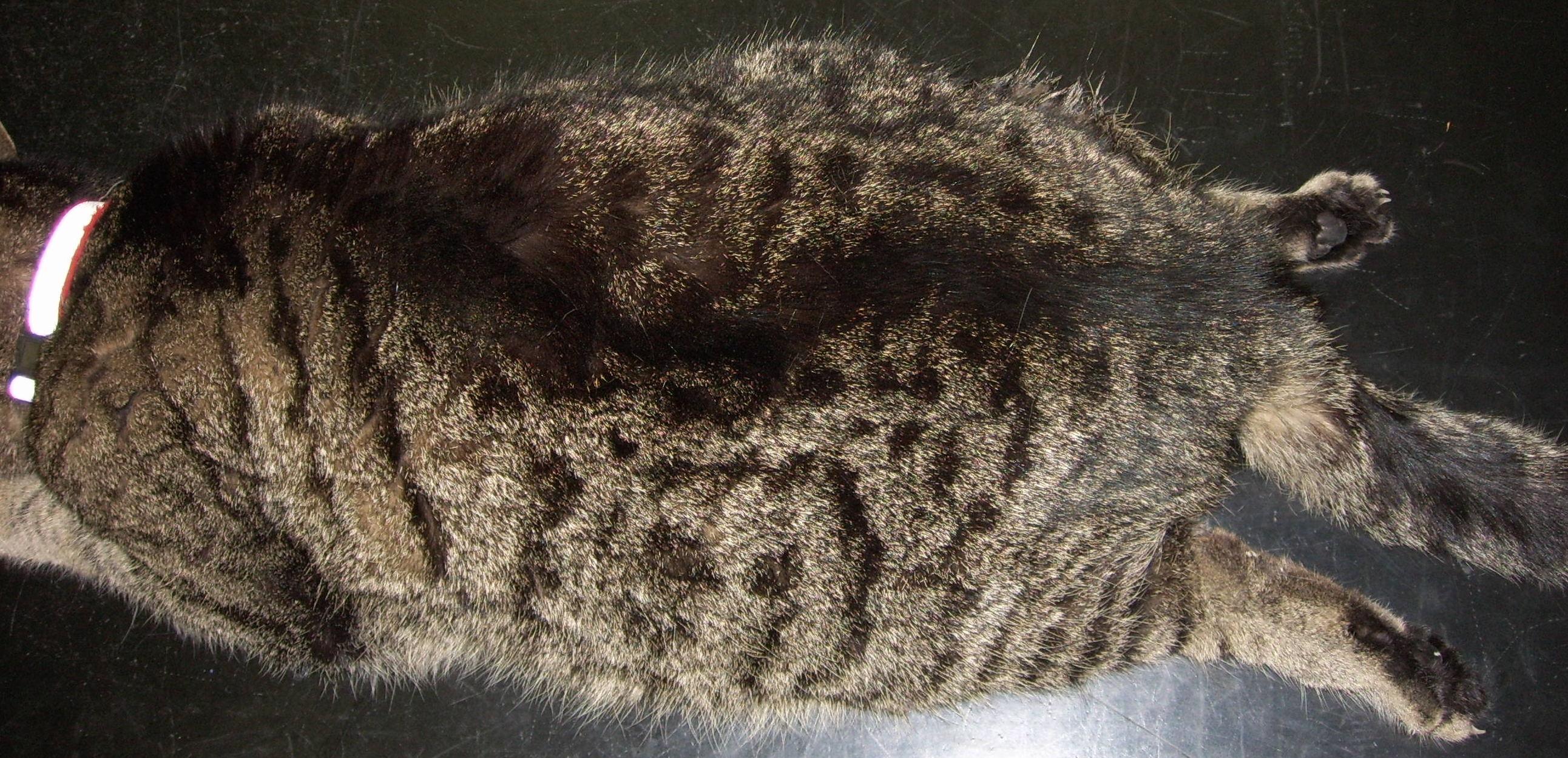
Bilateral hindlimb paralysis in a cat with arterial thromboembolism

Feline arterial thromboembolism (FATE syndrome) (German: Feline arterielle Thromboembolie) is a disease of the domestic cat in which blood clots (thrombi) block arteries, causing severe circulatory problems. The disease is rare, relative to the total number of feline patients, but is relatively common in cats with heart disease: about one-sixth of cats with heart disease are affected. Heart disease is the most common underlying cause of arterial thromboembolism. It leads to the formation of blood clots in the heart, which move into the bloodstream and obstruct larger arteries. In cats, the blockage mainly affects the aorta at the outlet of the two external iliac arteries. Arterial thromboembolism occurs suddenly and is very painful. The blockage of the terminal portion of the aorta results in an undersupply of blood to the hind legs. The result is paralysis, coldness of the rear extremities and, later, severe tissue damage. Rarely, other blood vessels are also affected; the symptoms of failure then depend on the supply area of the affected artery. Since drug thrombolysis in cats does not achieve satisfactory results, therapeutic focus is on the self-dissolution of the clot by the body's own repair processes. Pain management and thrombosis prevention are performed while the underlying disease is treated. The mortality of arterial thromboembolism in cats is very high: 50 to 60% of affected animals are euthanized without attempted treatment, and only one-quarter to one-third of animals survive such an event. In about half of the recovered cats, thromboembolism recurs despite anticoagulation prophylaxis.

== Incidence, cause and origin of disease ==
Feline arterial thromboembolism is a rare disease, accounting for approximately 0.1-0.3% of the total number of feline patients. The median age at onset of thromboembolism is 12 years (1 to 21 years).

Most common causes and their proportion in cats with arterial thromboembolism (after Smith et al. 2003).
Underlying disease	Frequency
hypertrophic cardiomyopathy	52%
other cardiomyopathy	17%
Hyperthyroidism	9%
Tumor	5%

FATE syndrome develops, in approximately 70% of cases, as a result of heart disease, most commonly heart disease with cardiac wall thickening (Hypertrophic Cardiomyopathy, HCM). Up to 17% of cats with HCM experience arterial thromboembolism, but cats with other cardiomyopathies are also at increased risk. Cats with abnormally increased hemostasis, which can occur with hyperthyroidism, tumors, extensive inflammation, blood poisoning (sepsis), injury, or disseminated intravascular coagulation, are another risk group. There is an increased genetic predisposition in male cats, which is related to the higher incidence of heart disease in male cats.

Thrombus in the terminal branch of the aorta in a cat. 1 opened aorta with thrombus, 2 external iliac arteries, 3 common trunk of both internal iliac arteries, 4 circumflex ilium profunda, 5 mesenteric caudal artery, 6 descending colon. circumflexa ilium profunda, 5 A. mesenterica caudalis, 6 Colon descendens

Damage to the endocardium and slowing of blood flow in the enlarged left atrium and atrial auricle are primarily responsible for the formation of blood clots (thrombi). Tissue damage leads to the release of tissue factor and hemostasis. The intact glycocalyx of the endothelial cells of the inner lining of the heart normally reduces contact with blood cells and macromolecules. If endothelial cell injury occurs, reactive oxygen species (ROS), nitric oxide (NO), matrix metalloproteinase, and proinflammatory cytokines are produced in increased amounts and cell adhesion molecules are upregulated. Endothelial cell damage exposes the underlying extracellular matrix, to which platelets attach and form a clot. The clot consists of platelets interconnected by the clotting protein fibrin. As the clot matures, the fibrin content increases and the clot may exhibit stratification. Even in healthy animals, injuries to the endothelium occur spontaneously from time to time, but there is a balance between thrombus formation and breakdown. Substances such as antithrombin III, thrombomodulin, tissue-type plasminogen activator and urokinase dissolve formed blood clots, and prostacyclin and nitric oxide inhibit platelet aggregation. Conservative treatment of arterial thromboembolism in cats is also based on this endogenous dissolution of the clot (see below).

In cats, the blood clots originate mainly in the left atrial auricle. They, or parts of them, are carried along with the blood flow, enter the aorta via the left ventricle, get stuck at vascular outlets and block them. This condition is called thromboembolism. In cats, this blockage occurs predominantly in the aorta in the area of its terminal branch, at the outlet of the two external iliac arteries (Aa. iliacae externae). This is also called "saddle thrombus" or "riding thrombus". This results in an ischemia to the rear extremities. In addition, platelets release thromboxane and serotonin, which leads to vasoconstriction and thus to reduced blood flow, even to blood vessels that are not directly affected. Serotonin also stimulates nociceptor, which contributes to the high painfulness of the disease. in 10% of cases, other blood vessels, such as the brachial artery, pulmonary arteries, cerebral circulatory system, intestinal vessels or coronary arteries, are affected.

In humans, heart disease (especially atrial fibrillation), increased blood clotting, and atherosclerosis are the most common underlying causes for the development of arterial thromboembolism. Similarly, thrombi develop primarily in the left side of the heart. Most commonly, cerebral arteries (cerebral infarction) and arteries of the leg (limb infarction, acute lower limb ischemia) are displaced. Less frequently, thromboembolism of the vessels of the arm, upper mesenteric artery or renal arteries (renal infarction) occurs. In contrast, aortoiliac occlusive disease (aortic bifurcation syndrome), which corresponds to the most common localization in cats, is extremely rare in humans. In domestic dogs, arterial thromboembolism occurs much less frequently than in cats; common underlying diseases in dogs are protein-losing nephropathy, diseases of the immune system, tumors, sepsis, heart disease, protein-losing enteropathy, and hypertension. Aortic thrombosis does occasionally occur in dogs, but here the thrombi arise directly at the aortic branch; as a thromboembolic event, as in cats, they are extremely rare. There are also isolated case reports of thromboembolism in the domestic horse but they are of no practical significance in other species. In laboratory animals used in human medical stroke research, thrombi are artificially generated.

== Symptoms, clinical diagnosis and laboratory findings ==
The disease occurs suddenly (peracute) and is accompanied by severe pain. Affected cats may "vocalize" and often have hypothermia. The extent of further signs of the disease depends on the location of the clot and whether the vessel is completely or only partially blocked. Occlusion of the iliac arteries results in partial or complete paralysis of the hind extremities. In most cases, both hind legs are affected. The muscles are hardened and painful after about 10 hours, especially the lower leg muscles. The pulse at the femoral artery (Arteria femoralis) is markedly decreased or absent in 78% of cases. The paws are cold and areas around the claws and pads often show bluish discoloration (cyanosis) or are strikingly pale. The reflexes of the hindlimb (patellar reflex, tibialis cranialis reflex, and flexor reflex) are severely reduced or absent. Increased respiratory rate, dyspnea, and syncope are common. Loss of perception may also occur. The main symptoms can be summarized in the "5-P rule" - paresis (Lähmung), pallor (Blässe), pain (Schmerz), pulselessness (Pulsverlust), poikilothermia (Untertemperatur). The tail muscles, anal reflex, and bladder function are mostly unaffected.

Other occlusions are much less common and the clinical presentation depends on the body part or organ affected. Occlusion of the brachial artery occurs predominantly on the right side and causes sudden paralysis of the forelimb. Thromboembolism of the pulmonary circulation manifests as increased respiratory frequency and shortness of breath. The clinical picture of cerebral infarction depends strongly on the vessel affected and thus on the area of the brain damaged. In most cases, there are unilateral neurological deficits. Occlusion of a coronary artery (myocardial infarction) leads to cardiac arrhythmias, usually with a fatal outcome, and is therefore rarely presented to a veterinarian at all; thus, its frequency is possibly underestimated. Occlusion of renal or intestinal vessels causes severe abdominal pain (acute abdomen) and often also lead quickly to death. There are also case reports of simultaneous occlusion of several vessels with paralysis of all limbs or of cerebellum and kidneys with severe balance disorders.

Large thrombus in the left atrium of a cat, echocardiography

Listening to the heart (auscultation) usually reveals heart murmurs, an irregular heartbeat, palpitations, extrasystoles and a "gallop rhythm" - a sequence of heart sounds reminiscent of a galloping horse. Up to two-thirds of FATE patients are in congestive heart failure, in which the heart no longer pumps enough blood to the body. Atrial fibrillation, detectable by ECG, is an additional risk factor. Aortic thrombus can often be visualized directly by sonography, and angiography or electromyography may also be performed if necessary. Echocardiography can be used to visualize thrombi and their precursors in the heart and to assess the functional status of the heart. Loss of pulse at the femoral artery can also be detected by doppler sonography, although the pulse is still detectable sonographically if the vessel is incompletely occluded. Infrared thermography can be used to objectify temperature differences between the forelimbs and hindlimbs. The sensitivity of this method is between 80 and 90%, the specificity is 100%. A thromboembolism of the lung often remains undetected; in this case, a chest radiograph can provide initial indications, and a definite diagnosis can be made by means of CT scan or scintigraphy of the lung. If a stroke is suspected, magnetic resonance imaging is indicated.

Activity of the enzymes creatine kinase (CK) and aspartate aminotransferase (AST) is elevated, due to the death of muscle cells in the blood. If cardiac disease is present, which is often the case, brain natriuretic peptide is above the reference range. Kidney values (creatinine, urea, SDMA) may also be elevated due to the shock-induced reduced renal function (prerenal azotemia). However, no laboratory values are specific to arterial thromboembolism and they play only a minor role in confirming the diagnosis. Determination of blood glucose or lactate concentration in the rest of the body, compared with that in the paralyzed limb, may be helpful. Determination of thyroxine (T4) concentration in the blood is useful for detecting hyperthyroidism; in 1.7% of cats with thromboembolism, hyperthyroidism had not been previously diagnosed.

== Diagnosis and differential diagnosis ==
In cases involving the most common localization (aortic thrombosis), diagnosis can be made based on patient history and clinical symptoms (peracute hindlimb paralysis without trauma). Existing cardiac disease may provides further clues, but cardiac disease is already diagnosed in only about 15% of cats with thromboembolism.

The other, more common cause of ischemic myopathy, tilt window syndrome , can usually be ruled out by questioning the animal's owner. In addition, tilt window syndrome is not associated with severe pain. Differential diagnosis must exclude trauma to the spinal cord (such as from a traffic accident or window fall), which may be due to an event not observed by the owner. A herniated disc or a spinal cord infarction can also lead to sudden signs of paralysis. Tumors in the spinal cord or spinal canal can also cause hindlimb paralysis, but these usually develop slowly and signs of loss occur gradually.

The diagnosis of vascular occlusions of the internal organs is more difficult; here, special examinations (CT, MRI) are required to confirm the diagnosis, which are only available in larger facilities.

== Therapy ==
Treatment of arterial thromboembolism in cats consists of pain management, prevention of further clot formation, and treatment of heart failure, if necessary. Intensive medical care is usually required for three days before treatment can be continued at home.

To reduce pain, administration of potent analgesics is indicated, with opioid analgesics, such as levomethadone or fentanyl, being the most effective. However, neither agent is approved for use in cats in the EU and must therefore be repurposed in the case of a therapeutic emergency. In addition, fentanyl is only effective for about 30 minutes, while levomethadone is effective for about 5 hours, based on data for dogs, which limits further treatment at home. Continuous drip infusion of the combination of fentanyl and lidocaine has been described. Lidocaine, in addition to its analgesic effect, can also provide a degree of protection against damage caused by reopening of the occluded vessel (reperfusion injury). However, the therapeutic range of lidocaine in cats is very narrow; as little as 6 mg/kg can be lethal. The only opioid analgesic approved for cats, buprenorphine, does not have sufficient analgesic effect for initial treatment, at least not when there is total occlusion of both external iliac arteries. It can be used for continuing treatment at home, especially since it can be easily administered through the oral mucosa and has a duration of action of about 8 hours. Non-opioid analgesics do not provide adequate pain relief and may increase circulatory disturbances in animals, causing renal or gastrointestinal damage. Only metamizole is suitable for subsequent treatment.

Structural formula of clopidogrel

Inhibiting the formation of further blood clots, thrombosis prophylaxis, is the second important pillar of FATE treatment. It should be carried out as early as possible. For this purpose, agents to inhibit hemostasis, such as low-molecular-weight heparins are used first, along with agents to prevent platelet aggregation, such as aspirin and clopidogrel. For long-term prophylaxis, clopidogrel is preferred, because it significantly prolongs survival compared with aspirin. The use of the active ingredient rivaroxaban as another effective drug is also being discussed. A 2021 study was able to show that the combination of clopidogrel and rivaroxaban is an effective recurrence prophylaxis.

Cats in congestive heart failure are given supplemental oxygen to compensate for the hypoxia. High doses of furosemide are used to reduce preload and afterload and thus relieve the heart. In advanced heart disease with dilated cardiomyopathy (DCM) or HCM, pumping efficiency can be improved with pimobendan, and possibly also with dobutamine. Pimobendan also slightly increases blood flow in the left atrium and atrial appendage and additionally improves atrial function. On the other hand, if there is no congestive heart failure but there is reduced blood flow, then electrolytes are infused. In the case of underlying hyperthyroidism, thyrostatic drugs, such as thiamazole or carbimazole, are administered.

The benefit of external heat application in cats with hypothermia is controversial. Often, the anterior part of the body has a normal temperature, and hypothermia only affects the posterior part and thus also the rectum, where body temperature is normally measured in cats, since measurement in the axillary region or in the ear is unreliable. However, comparison between axillary and rectal temperature may help distinguish between local and general hypothermia. In the case of the latter, an application of heat is indicated.

The obvious treatment, reopening of the vessel by thrombolysis or thrombectomy, which has long been established in human medicine for occlusive diseases such as cerebral infarction or myocardial infarction, provides unsatisfactory results in cats and is therefore no longer recommended.

Various studies have shown that thrombolysis with streptokinase, urokinase or tissue-type plasminogen activator has not improved treatment success. Instead, it usually results in frequently fatal reperfusion injury, hyperkalemia, metabolic acidosis, kidney failure, and bleeding, such that the survival rate is often lower than it is with conservative treatment. Surgical removal of the thrombus is rarely performed in veterinary medicine because of the associated risks, although it can be successful in individual cases. It is associated with the same complications as thrombolysis and is, therefore, no longer recommended. In human medicine, such treatments are only performed in highly specialized facilities with a high level of personnel and equipment.

Current treatment for cats focuses on endogenous dissolution of the clot and thus spontaneous revascularization, which occurs quickly enough in just under 40% of cases.

== Prognosis and prevention ==
Spontaneous echocardiographic contrast ('smoke') - a precursor of thrombus formation - in the left atrium of a cat

The treatment outlook for aortic thromboembolism is uncertain to poor. According to a U.S. study, only about one-third of cats survive arterial thromboembolism, with half of those who die being euthanized without attempted treatment. In a U.K. study, about 60% of patients were euthanized. Only 27% survived the first 24 hours. The median survival time was 94 days and, after one year, only 2% of the animals were still alive.

Prognosis depends largely on the extent and duration of damage, with bilateral complete occlusions of the iliac arteries having the lowest chance of survival. If only one limb is affected and there is residual motor function, there is a better chance that the cat will recover and continue to live with a good quality of life. If the internal body temperature is above 37.2 °C (99.0 °F), the normal temperature in domestic cats being about 39 °C (102 °F), the prospect of treatment is better than if the temperature is more severely below normal. Excess blood potassium and elevated kidney enzymes are other negative prognostic factors. Even after spontaneous reopening of the blood vessel, relapses often occur due to a new thromboembolism, which even thromboprophylaxis cannot reliably prevent. In half of the patients, a new thromboembolism occurs despite treatment with clopidogrel. In addition, the extent of the heart disease, in particular the extent of atrial enlargement and the pumping capacity of the left ventricle, determines the further survival of the patient.

In contrast, the prognosis is favorable in cases of occlusion of smaller cerebral arteries. There is often a reduction in the signs of failure within two to three weeks, as other areas of the brain take over the function of the infarcted area. Occlusion of the brachial artery also has a good chance of recovery. The prognosis and mortality of pulmonary thromboembolism is not known, as it is very rare. Anecdotal reports indicate that cats can survive such an event and lung function can return to normal with formation of collaterals. Other occlusions (intestinal, renal, and coronary arteries) are very often fatal.

Some small-animal cardiologists recommend coagulation prophylaxis in the presence of certain cardiac changes, before the occurrence of thromboembolism. For example, one study showed that a flow velocity in the left aortic branch of less than 0.2 m/s was associated with the occurrence of thrombi and spontaneous echocardiographic contrast. Spontaneous echocardiographic contrast is an aggregation of red blood cells and thus a thrombus precursor that resembles smoke on sonographic imaging. However, prospective studies demonstrating the efficacy of such treatment have yet to be performed.

== Bibliography ==
- Dominik Faissler (2005), "Ischämische Myopathie", in Andre Jaggy (ed.), Atlas und Lehrbuch der Kleintierneurologie, Hannover: Schlütersche, pp. 272–273, ISBN 3-87706-739-5
- Florian Sänger und Rene Dörfelt: Feline arterielle Thromboembolie – Aktueller Stand der Diagnostik und Therapie. In: Kleintierpraxis Band 65, Nummer 4, April 2020, S. 220–235. doi:10.2377/0023-2076-65-220
- Lisa Joy Miriam Keller (2019), "Hypertrophe Kardiomyopathie der Katze", in Markus Killich (ed.), Kleintierkardiologie., Stuttgart: Georg Thieme, pp. 369–370, ISBN 978-3-13-219991-0
- Alan Kovacevic (2017), "Kardiologische Notfälle", in Nadja Siegrist (ed.), Notfallmedizin für Hund und Katze, Stuttgart: Enke, pp. 231–255, ISBN 978-3-13-205281-9
