= Encephalomalacia =

Cerebral softening
- Other names: Encephalomalacia
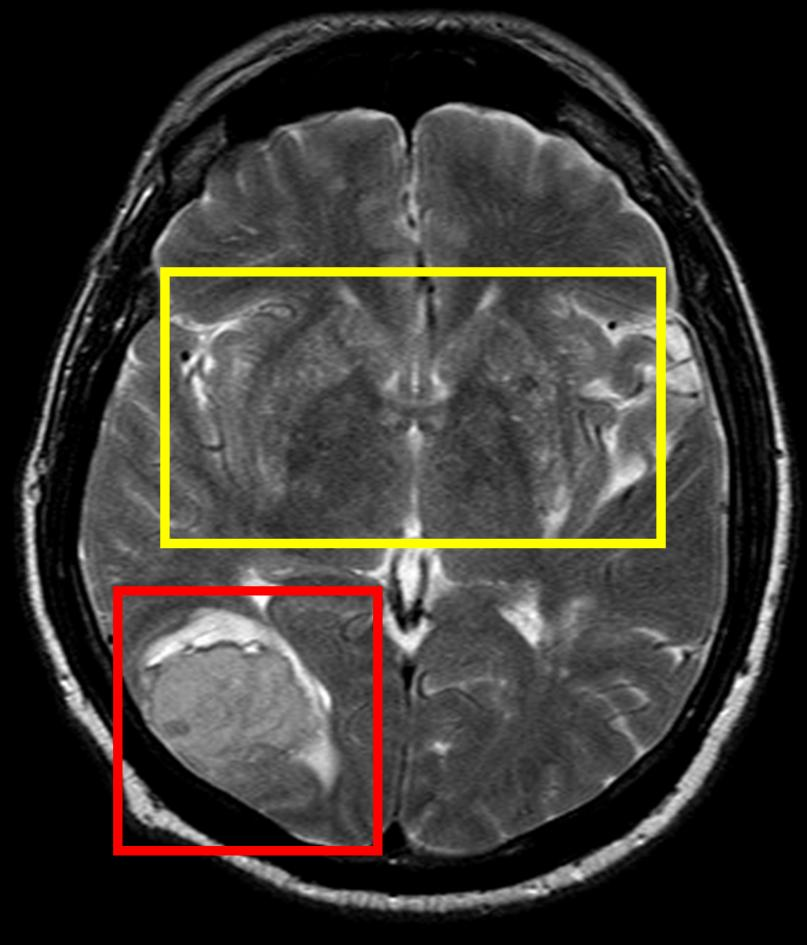
- Stroke brain (similar to cerebral softening)
- Specialty: Neurology

Cerebral softening, also known as encephalomalacia, is a localized softening of the substance of the brain, due to bleeding or inflammation. Three varieties, distinguished by their color and representing different stages of the disease progress, are known respectively as red, yellow, and white softening.

== Causes ==
=== Stroke ===
Ischemia: A decrease or restriction of circulating blood flow to a region of the brain which deprives neurons of the necessary substrates (primarily glucose); represents 80% of all strokes. A thrombus or embolus plugs an artery so there is a reduction or cessation of blood flow. This hypoxia or anoxia leads to neuronal injury, which is known as a stroke. The death of neurons leads to a so-called softening of the cerebrum in the affected area.

Hemorrhage: Intracerebral hemorrhage occurs in deep penetrating vessels and disrupts the connecting pathways, causing a localized pressure injury and in turn injury to brain tissue in the affected area. Hemorrhaging can occur in instances of embolic ischemia, in which the previously obstructed region spontaneously restores blood flow. This is known as a hemorrhagic infarction and a resulting red infarct occurs, which points to a type of cerebral softening known as red softening.

=== Circle of Willis ===
In a study on the circle of Willis and its relation to cerebral vascular disorders, a comparison on various anomalies between normal brains (those without the condition of cerebral softening) and brains with cerebral softening were looked at to observe trends in the differences of the anatomical structure of the circle of Willis. Statistically significant results were found in the percentage of normal brains that had a normal circle of Willis and those that had cerebral softening and had a normal circle of Willis. The results yielded 52% of normal brains having a normal circle of Willis, while only 33% of brains with cerebral softening had a normal circle of Willis. There were also a higher number of string-like vessels in brains with cerebral softening (42%), than there were in normal brains (27%). These results point to an assumption of a higher incidence rate of anomalies in brains with cerebral softening versus those that do not have cerebral softening.

== Types of softening ==
=== Red softening ===
Red softening is one of the three types of cerebral softening. As its name suggests, certain regions of cerebral softening result in a red color. This is due to a hemorrhagic infarct, in which blood flow is restored to an area of the brain that was previously restricted by an embolism. This is termed a "red infarct" or also known as red softening.

Upon autopsy of several subjects, Dr. Cornelio Fazio found that the most common areas of this type of softening occurred where there was a hemorrhage of the middle cerebral artery or the superior or deep branches to it. The subjects' softened area was not always near the arteries but where the capillaries perfused the brain tissue. The symptoms were similar to that of a stroke.

=== White softening ===
White softening is another form of cerebral softening. This type of softening occurs in areas that continue to be poorly perfused, with little to no blood flow. These are known as "pale" or "anemic infarcts" and are areas that contain dead neuronal tissue, which result in a softening of the cerebrum.

=== Yellow softening ===
Yellow softening is the third type of cerebral softening. As its name implies, the affected softened areas of the brain have a yellow appearance. This yellow appearance is due to atherosclerotic plaque build-up in interior brain arteries coupled with yellow lymph around the choroid plexus, which occurs in specific instances of brain trauma.

== Stages ==
=== Early life ===
Newborn cerebral softening has traditionally been attributed to trauma at birth and its effect on brain tissue into adulthood. However, more recent research shows that cerebral softening in newborns and the degeneration of white matter is caused by asphyxia and/or later infection. There is no causal evidence to support the hypothesis that problems in labor contribute to the development of softening in infant white matter. Also, further evidence shows a possible connection between low sugar and high protein levels in cerebral spinal fluid that can contribute to disease or virus susceptibility leading to cerebral softening.

=== Later life ===
Cases of cerebral softening in infancy versus in adulthood are much more severe due to an infant's inability to sufficiently recover brain tissue loss or compensate the loss with other parts of the brain. Adults can more easily compensate and correct for the loss of tissue use and therefore the mortality likelihood in an adult with cerebral softening is less than in an infant.

== Documented cases ==
In this late 19th-century case study, a 10-year-old boy was found to have cerebral softening in specific parts of the brain, limiting specific sensory function. The identifiable softening enabled researchers to detect and partition cerebral areas related to different sensory perceptions.

Another case in the late 19th century showed that cerebral softening, when caused by hemorrhaging, can affect various neural pathways leading to convulsions, spasms, coma and death.

A third case in 1898 followed the ten-day decline of a 66-year-old woman with cerebral softening. She had yellow softening which led to symptoms that started slowly with transient facial paralysis on the right side of the face. The limbs later became cold and the right side of the body transiently progressed between semi-paralysis and tetanus. Her heart rate and respiration rate became slow by days three and four. Later she developed a yellow jaundiced appearance in the sclera and skin that the doctor proposed as paroxysmal hemoglobinuria upon autopsy. On the last days, the paralysis became more frequent, respiration rose and she developed tachycardia. She died on the evening of the tenth day. The autopsy revealed that the top of the brain down to the lateral ventricle were healthy, but below that there was a 2.5 × 2 × 1 inch area on the left side of the brain that was softened and yellow. The choroid plexus was also matted and surrounded by vessels filled with yellow lymph. The floor of the left lateral ventricle, thalamus, and corpus striatum were softened to the point of unrecognition. These physical abnormalities match the symptoms mentioned and are a prime example of yellow cerebral softening.

In 1858 doctor Thomas Inman described four of thirty discovered cases with cerebral softening. Each case was similar to the previous article. There was some atheroma in the internal brain arteries that led to the cerebral softening of the left side of the brain around the left lateral ventricle, thalamus and corpus striatum. There were similar right sided numbness in some patients, coldness of the extremities, and impairments in vision. In some cases, the lungs and the pleura were stuck together as well as the intestines to the peritoneal wall. This again matches yellow cerebral softening.
