= Hemorrhagic infarct =

Bleeding around an area of dead tissue

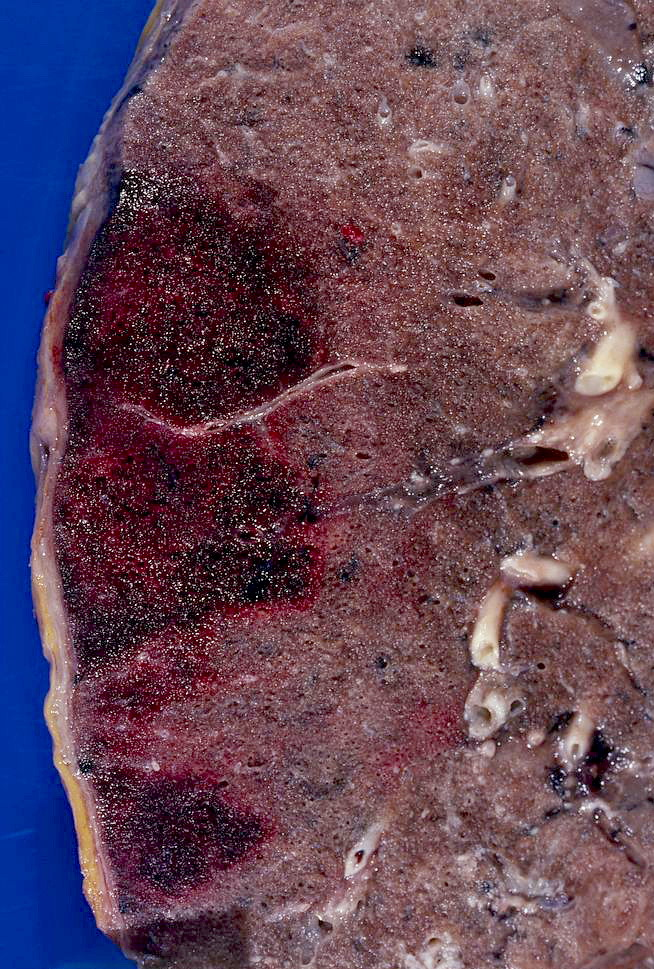
- Recent hemorrhagic infarcts.
- Specialty: Vascular surgery

A hemorrhagic infarct is determined when hemorrhage is present around an area of infarction (an area of dead tissue or necrosis). When blood escapes outside of the vessel (extravasation) and re-perfuses back into the tissue surrounding the infarction, the infarction is then termed a hemorrhagic infarct (infarction). Hemorrhagic infarcts can occur in any region of the body, such as the head, trunk and abdomen-pelvic regions, typically arising from their arterial blood supply being interrupted by a blockage or compression of an artery.

== Causes ==
Infarcts typically occur due to one of two reasons. One is due to hypoxia or a lack of oxygen to tissue. The other cause is ischemia, which occurs when there is a lack of blood flow to the tissues. Ischemia is more serious and can be caused by several factors. These factors include atherosclerosis, thrombus, embolism, trauma to vessels, neoplasms, cytomegalovirus, encapsulation or external compression of a vessel, or if a vessel becomes twisted, such as in torsion.

== Classification ==
After an infarction, the color of the tissue is used to classify the infarctions into one of two type of infarcts:

1. White infarcts (anemic infarct or pale infarcts) are used to describe a soft, pale area of tissue and occur in organs that have a single supply of blood and solid parenchyma. Typical organs that experience an anemic infarct include the heart, kidneys and spleen.
2. Red (hemorrhagic) infarcts have a dual blood supply and appear red to brown in color due to the hemorrhage of blood perfusing back into the tissue from a collateral or secondary vessel. These organs have a loose parenchyma, such as the lungs, brain and gastrointestinal tract.

=== Common red infarcts ===
==== Cerebral ====
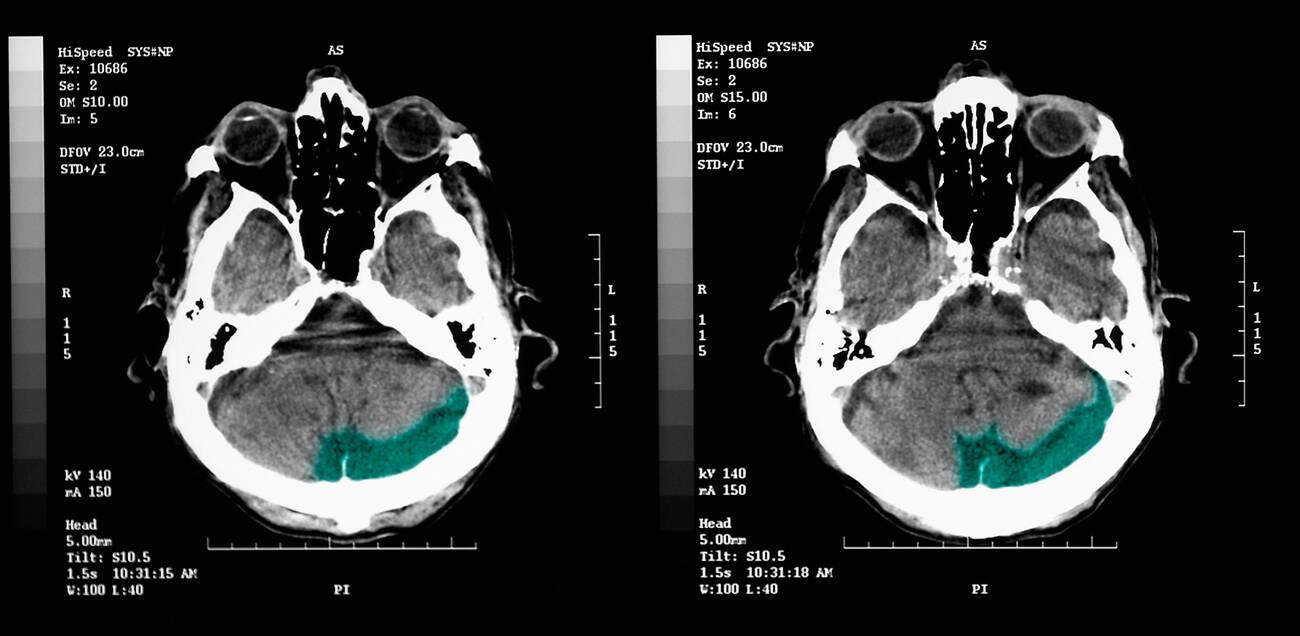
An axial non-contrast CT (NCCT) brain slice profile on a diagnostic workstation, serving as the primary imaging modality for the early evaluation and diagnosis of cerebral red (hemorrhagic) infarcts.

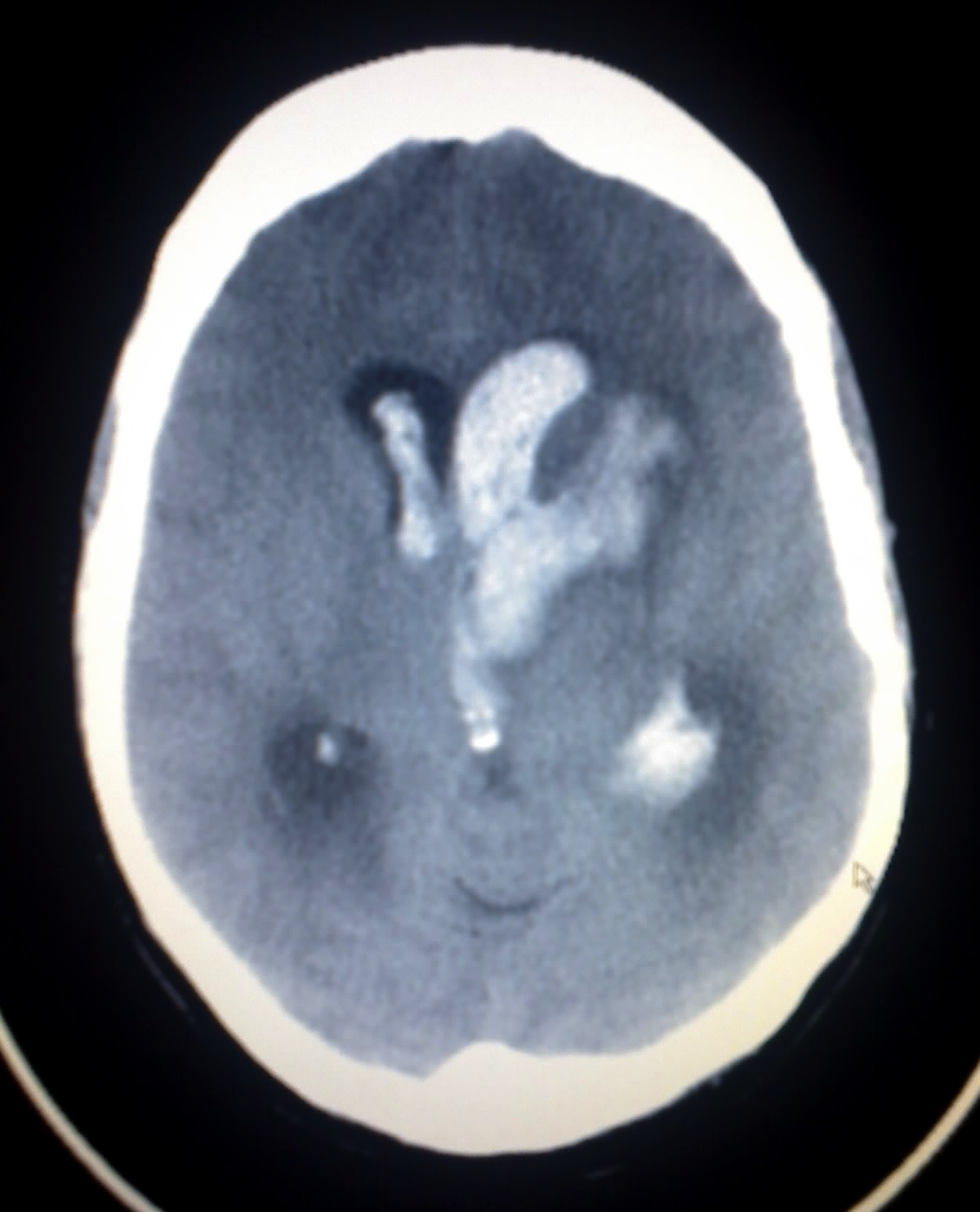
Intercerebral hemorrhage

Otherwise known as hemorrhagic stroke, these account for approximately 15% of all strokes. Classified according to one of four origination sites, intracerebral (ICH), subarachnoid, subdural, or epidural. Both subdural and epidural hemorrhages are most always caused by trauma, therefore, they are not considered hemorrhagic strokes.

- Hypertension is the predominant cause of intracerebral hemorrhage. The clinical presentation and signs and symptoms depend on the location of affected structures in the brain and which vessel is involved. A non-contrast Cat Scan of the head should be utilized as the primary imaging modality during initial diagnosis. Prognosis and treatment are determined by location and size of the hemorrhage.
- Subarachnoid hemorrhage is most commonly caused by the rupture of an aneurysm, usually at the base of the brain. Prior to rupture,
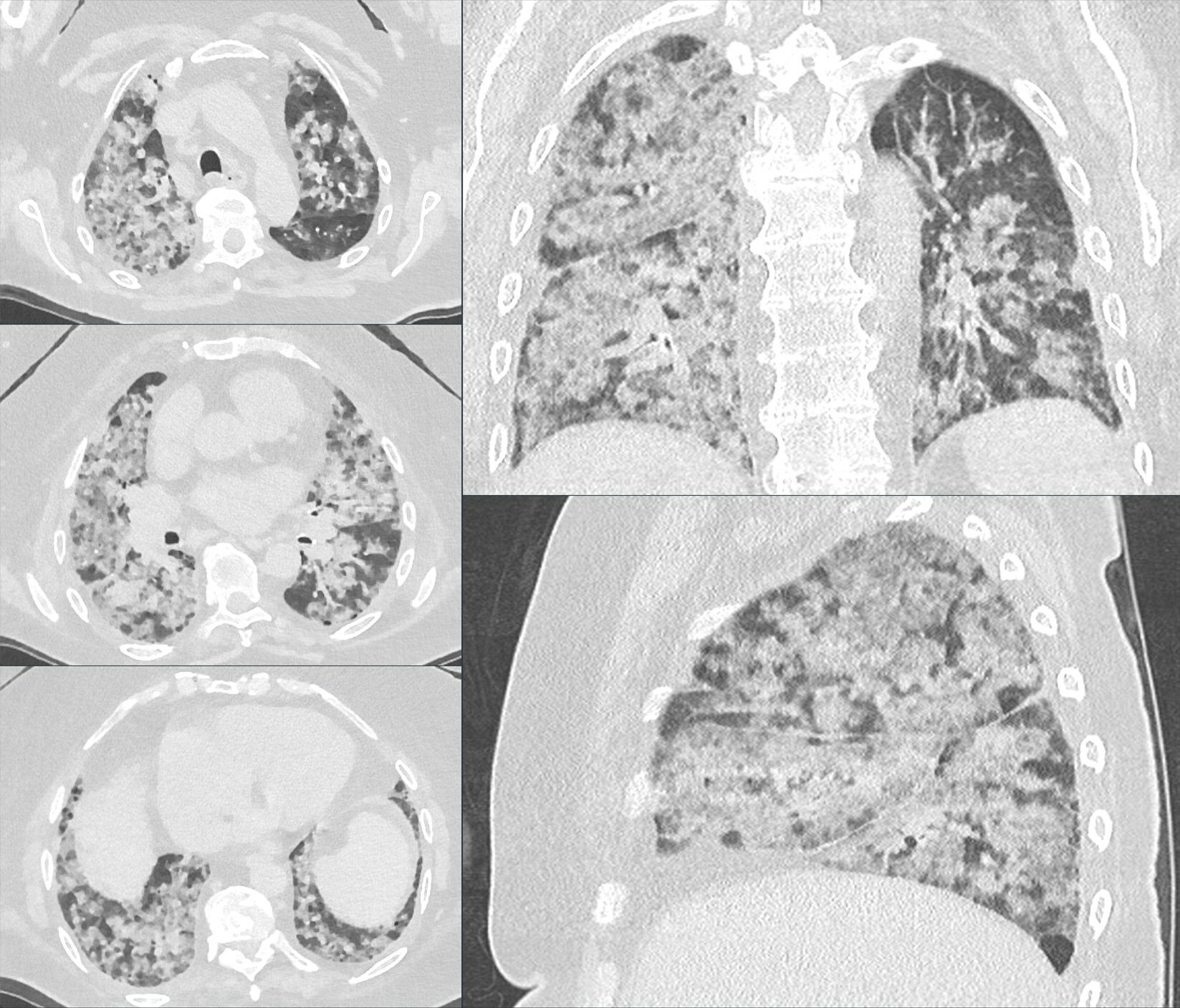
  Diffuse hemorrhage from the alveoli in the lungs

symptoms include headache, diplopia or blurred vision. After rupture, the headache is typically described as the "worst headache of my life". Other symptoms include nausea, vomiting and loss of consciousness. Neurological signs can develop as the hemorrhage flows into surrounding tissues. Initial imaging will include a non-contrast CT head possibly followed by the use of contrast media to perform CT angiography of the vessels in the brain to detect the aneurysm site if the non-contrast CT head is negative. Treatment can include surgical or endovascular intervention with clips or coils to prevent re-rupture or ventricular drainage or shunting due to hydrocephalus. Cerebral vasospasm can occur up to two weeks after the subarachnoid hemorrhage, which can cause further ischemia because of the vessel narrowing during the spasm.

==== Pulmonary ====
This commonly occurs when a distal pulmonary artery becomes occluded following a pulmonary embolism or other lung pathologies that can include malignancy, infection, or vasculitis. A large percentage (77–87%) of lung infarctions occur unilaterally, and typically in the lower lobes compared to the upper lobes. Symptoms of pulmonary infarction and pulmonary embolism are similar. Dyspnea, chest pain, pain and swelling in a lower extremity, and hemoptysis are common symptoms in both. Chest X-Ray can demonstrate a "Hampton's Hump" when pulmonary infarction is present, but Cat Scan is more commonly used. Treatment is dictated by the underlying cause of the pulmonary infarction which has a broad differential diagnosis that should be considered during treatment. The underlying cause will assist in a treatment plan to include level of care during initial management and the involvement of various specialists as pulmonary infarction can be deadly.

==== Gastrointestinal ====
The most frequent type of gastrointestinal ischemia is ischemic colitis. The disruption to the blood supply can be chronic or acute. Its effects can vary from ulceration, hemorrhage or necrosis. A surgical repair is typically emergent as the ischemia is associated with high morbidity and mortality rates. Ischemic colitis is the second-leading cause of lower gastrointestinal bleeding. The risk of ischemic colitis is directly proportional to age and is more common in the older population but can occur in younger individuals. A Cat Scan of the Abdomen and Pelvis with IV contrast is considered the gold standard in imaging for diagnosis, but other imaging modalities can be used if it is contraindicated for a patient to have a Cat Scan with contrast. Presentation of patients typically include complaints of "abdominal pain, nausea, vomiting, diarrhea, abdominal distention and rectal bleeding".

== See also ==
- Infarction
- Anemic infarct
- Cerebral infarction
- Lung infarction
- Myocardial infarction
- Renal infarction
- Splenic infarction
- Bowel infarction
- Reperfusion injury
