= Muscle infarction =

Muscle infarction may refer to:

- Myocardial infarction of heart muscle
- Skeletal muscle infarction
