= Anemic infarct =

Pale region of tissue death due to blocked arteries

Anemic infarcts (also called white infarcts or pale infarcts) are white or pale infarcts caused by arterial occlusions, and are usually seen in the heart, kidney and spleen.

These are referred to as "white" because of the lack of hemorrhaging and limited red blood cell accumulation (compared to hemorrhagic infarct). The tissues most likely to be affected are solid organs which limit the amount of hemorrhage that can seep into the area of ischemic necrosis from adjoining capillary beds.They typically occur in organs with a single blood supply, lacking dual arterial supply or significant anastomoses. The infarct generally results grossly in a wedge-shaped area of necrosis with the apex closest to the occlusion and the base at the periphery of the organ. Over time, the margins become better defined, with a narrow rim of congestion attributable to inflammation at the edge of the lesion. Relatively few extravasated red cells are lysed, so the resulting hemosiderosis is limited. This contributes to a progressively paler area of infarction over time. Ischemic coagulative necrosis occurs, and fibrosis of the affected area develops from a reparative response that begins at the preserved margins and progresses inward. An exception to coagulative necrosis is the brain, which undergoes liquefactive necrosis following infarction.

== See also ==
- Hemorrhagic infarct
- Infarction
