= Renal infarction =

Disruption to the kidney's blood supply

- Other names: Kidney infarction
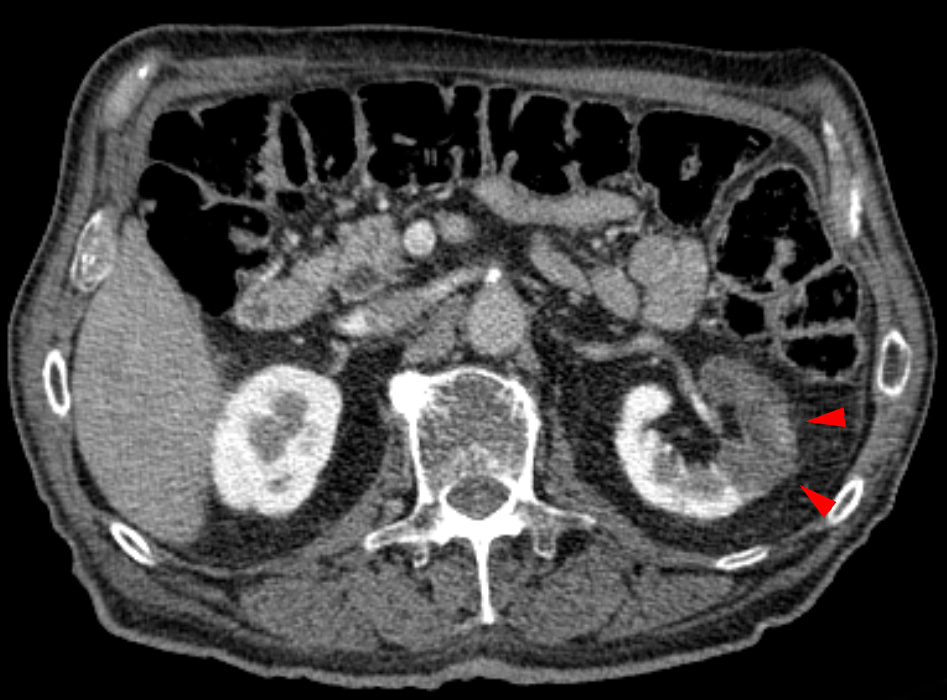
- CT scan of the abdomen showing partial infarct of the left kidney.
- Specialty: Nephrology
- Symptoms: Abdominal pain, nausea, vomiting, and fever.
- Complications: Acute kidney injury and chronic kidney disease.
- Causes: Cardioembolic disease, renal artery injury, and hypercoagulable state.
- Diagnostic method: Hematuria, elevated lactate dehydrogenase, CT scan.
- Differential diagnosis: Renal colic and acute pyelonephritis.
- Frequency: 1.4% (of 14,411)

Renal infarction is a medical condition caused by an abrupt disruption of the renal blood flow in either one of the segmental branches or the major ipsilateral renal artery. Patients who have experienced an acute renal infarction usually report sudden onset flank pain, which is often accompanied by fever, nausea, and vomiting.

The primary causes of renal infarction are hypercoagulable conditions, renal artery damage (usually brought on by arterial dissection), and cardioembolic illness.

== Signs and symptoms ==
The most common symptoms of a renal infarction are acute onset flank pain, fever, nausea, and vomiting. This may be accompanied by an abrupt rise in blood pressure, most likely due to renin mediation. Rarely oliguria will be present.

=== Complications ===
Complications include acute kidney injury that can progress to chronic kidney disease.

== Causes ==
Acute renal infarction is mostly caused by two major causes: in situ renal artery thrombosis, which is less common, and thromboemboli, which typically results from thrombus in the heart or aorta.

=== Risk factors ===
Atrial fibrillation, a prior embolism history, mitral stenosis, diabetes, hypertension, and ischemic heart disease are risk factors for renal infarction.

== Diagnosis ==
Most patients have been reported to have gross or microscopic hematuria. Significantly increased serum lactate dehydrogenase levels and proteinuria may also be observed. Renal angiography is still the gold standard, but CT renal angiography, CT angiography, and DMSA radioisotope scan can also be used to establish the diagnosis.

== Treatment ==
There are no comparative trials to determine the best course of action for renal infarction brought on by thromboemboli, in situ thrombosis, or renal artery dissection. Reported treatments include open surgery, endovascular therapy, endovascular therapy (thrombolysis/thrombectomy with or without angioplasty), and anticoagulation.

== Outlook ==
Renal infarction 30-day mortality was 11.4% in a retrospective analysis of 44 individuals with atrial fibrillation and renal infarction.

== Epidemiology ==
In 1940, a study of 14,411 autopsies revealed that 1.4% of the cases involved renal infarction.

A retrospective study that was carried out during a 36-month observation period revealed that the incidence of renal infarction among patients who visit the ED was 0.007%.

== See also ==
- Kidney ischemia
- Renal artery stenosis
