= Arteriosclerosis obliterans =

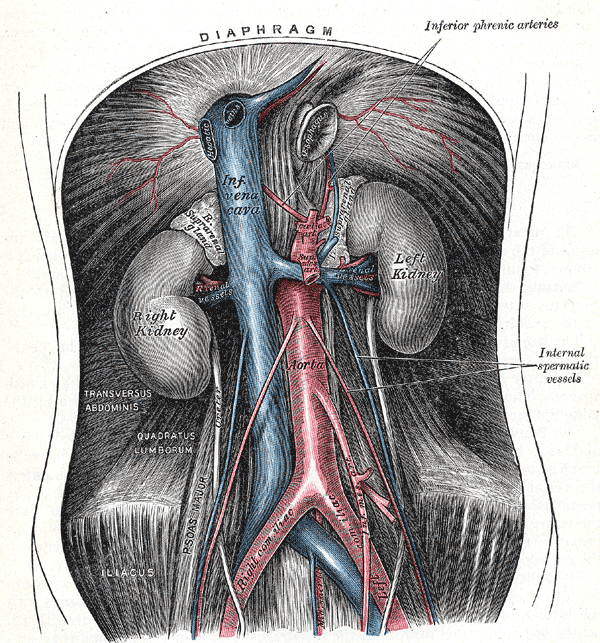
- Abdominal aorta
- Specialty: Cardiology
- Symptoms: pain, numbness, and fatigue in the muscles on exercise.

Arteriosclerosis obliterans is an occlusive arterial disease most prominently affecting the abdominal aorta and the small- and medium-sized arteries of the lower extremities, which may lead to absent dorsalis pedis, posterior tibial, and/or popliteal artery pulses.

It is characterized by fibrosis of the tunica intima and calcification of the tunica media.

== See also ==
- Arteriosclerosis
- Monckeberg's arteriosclerosis
- Skin lesion
