= Embolectomy =

Surgical removal of emboli

- ICD-9-CM: 39.74, 38.0, 38.1
- MeSH: D017128

Embolectomy is the emergency interventional or surgical removal of emboli which are blocking blood circulation. It usually involves removal of thrombi (blood clots), and is then referred to as thromboembolectomy or thrombectomy. Embolectomy is an emergency procedure often as the last resort because permanent occlusion of a significant blood flow to an organ leads to necrosis. Other involved therapeutic options are anticoagulation and thrombolysis.

== Medical uses ==
Surgical embolectomy for massive pulmonary embolism (PE) has become a rare procedure and is often viewed as a last resort. Thrombolytic therapy has become the treatment of choice.

Surgical or catheter embolectomy is a procedure performed in patients with pulmonary embolism, which is a blockage of an artery in the lung caused by a blood clot. This procedure is typically used for patients who are in a critical condition, such as those who are experiencing persisting shock despite receiving supportive care, and who have an absolute contraindication for thrombolytic therapy. During the procedure, a catheter is inserted into the affected artery, and the clot is removed using a variety of techniques such as mechanical fragmentation or suction. However, it's important to note that there is a risk of complications such as bleeding, infection, and damage to the artery or surrounding tissue. This procedure is done under general anesthesia and with the help of imaging technology like angiography, and it's performed by interventional radiologists or cardiothoracic surgeons. And although other treatments have improved urgent surgical embolectomy or catheter embolectomy may be a life saving procedure in severe pulmonary embolism.

Embolectomies are performed as limb-sparing techniques for arterial embolisms in acute limb ischemia. However, there are also other options, such as catheter-directed thrombolysis and anticoagulation with observation. It can also be used for other ischemias due to embolism for example mesenteric ischemia and stroke.

== Methods ==
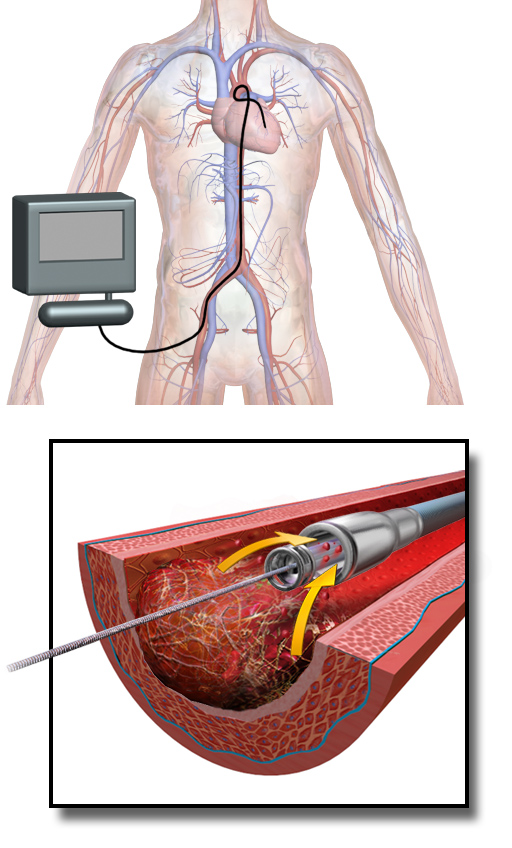
Illustration of an AngioJet; coronary thrombectomy

=== Catheter embolectomy ===
==== Balloon embolectomy ====
Typically this is done by inserting a catheter with an inflatable balloon attached to its tip into an artery, passing the catheter tip beyond the clot, inflating the balloon, and removing the clot by withdrawing the catheter. The catheter is called Fogarty, named after its inventor Thomas J. Fogarty.

Possible complications of balloon embolectomy include intimal lesions, which can lead to another thrombosis. The vessel may also be affected by a dissection or rupture. The procedure may lead to cholesterol embolism from atherosclerotic plaques.

==== Aspiration embolectomy ====
Catheter embolectomy is also used for aspiration embolectomy, where the thrombus is removed by suction rather than pushing with a balloon. It is a rapid and effective way of removing thrombi in thromboembolic occlusions of the limb arteries below the inguinal ligament, as in leg infarction.

=== Surgical embolectomy ===
Surgical embolectomy is the simple surgical removal of a clot following incision into a vessel by open surgery on the artery.

== Outcome ==
Outcome of embolectomy varies with size and location of the embolus.

In pulmonary embolism recent data shows mortality as being approximately 20%. Although this is a high mortality, it may have life-saving potential in some instances.

== Background ==
Emboli are abnormal masses of material (which can be solid, liquid or gas) that are carried in the blood stream from one part of the circulation to another causing a blockage (occlusion) of a blood vessel that leads to lack of oxygen supply (ischemia) and finally infarction of tissue downstream of the embolus.

The most common type of emboli are a blood clot generated by thrombosis which has then broken off and is then transported in the blood stream

There are two areas where emboli can form and therefore impact:

- Arterial emboli form in the left side of the heart or the main arteries, they impact in body tissues but not the lungs, commonly in the brain and the small vessels in the upper and lower limbs
- Venous emboli arise in veins (for example emboli which form from deep venous thrombosis or DVT) and these impact in the lung (see pulmonary embolism).

== See also ==
- Interventional radiology
- Thrombolysis
- Heparin and other anticoagulants
