= Embolism =

Blockage of a blood vessel by a circulatory mass (embolus)

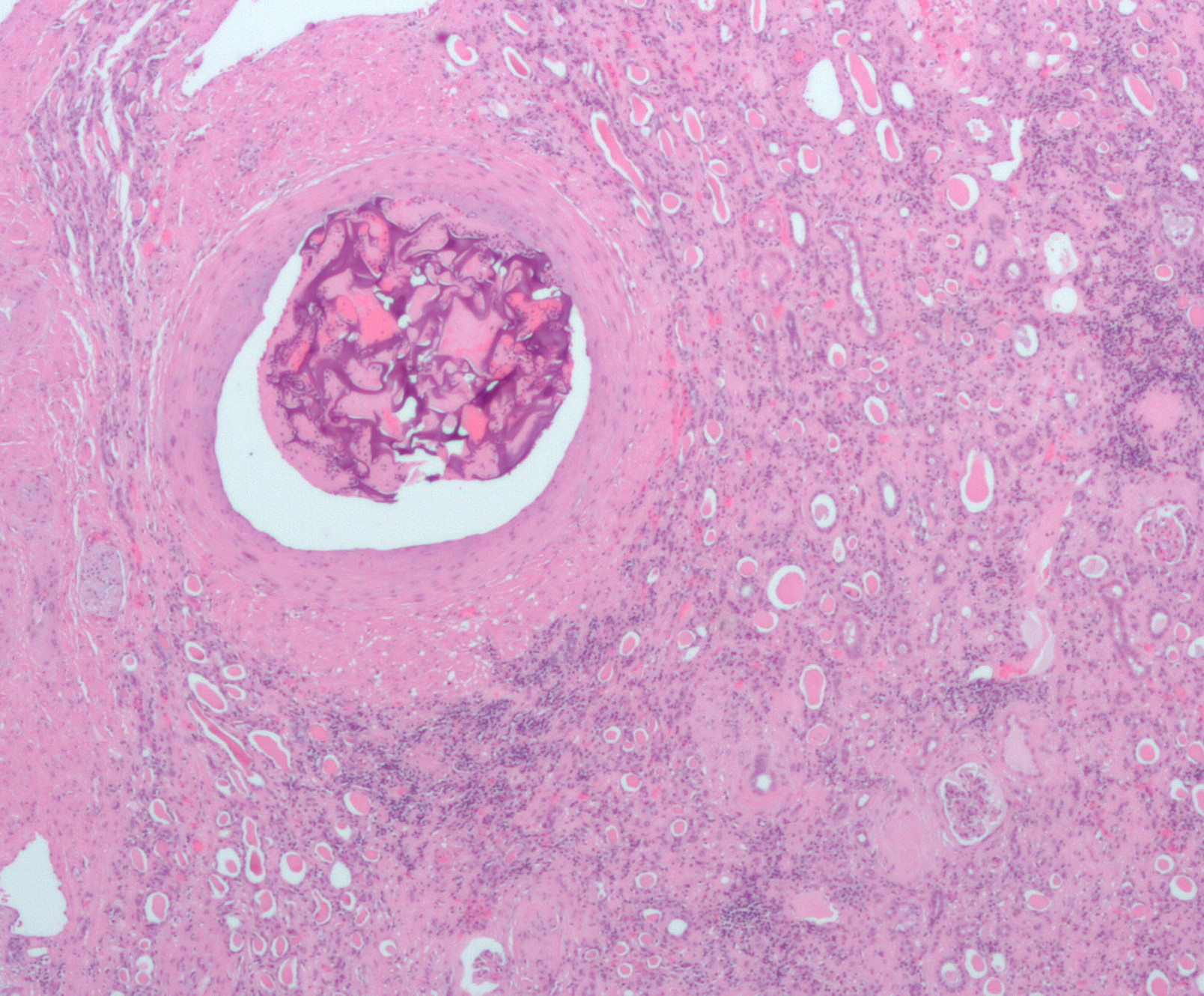
- Micrograph of embolic material in the artery of a kidney. The kidney was surgically removed because of cancer. H&E stain.
- Specialty: Vascular surgery

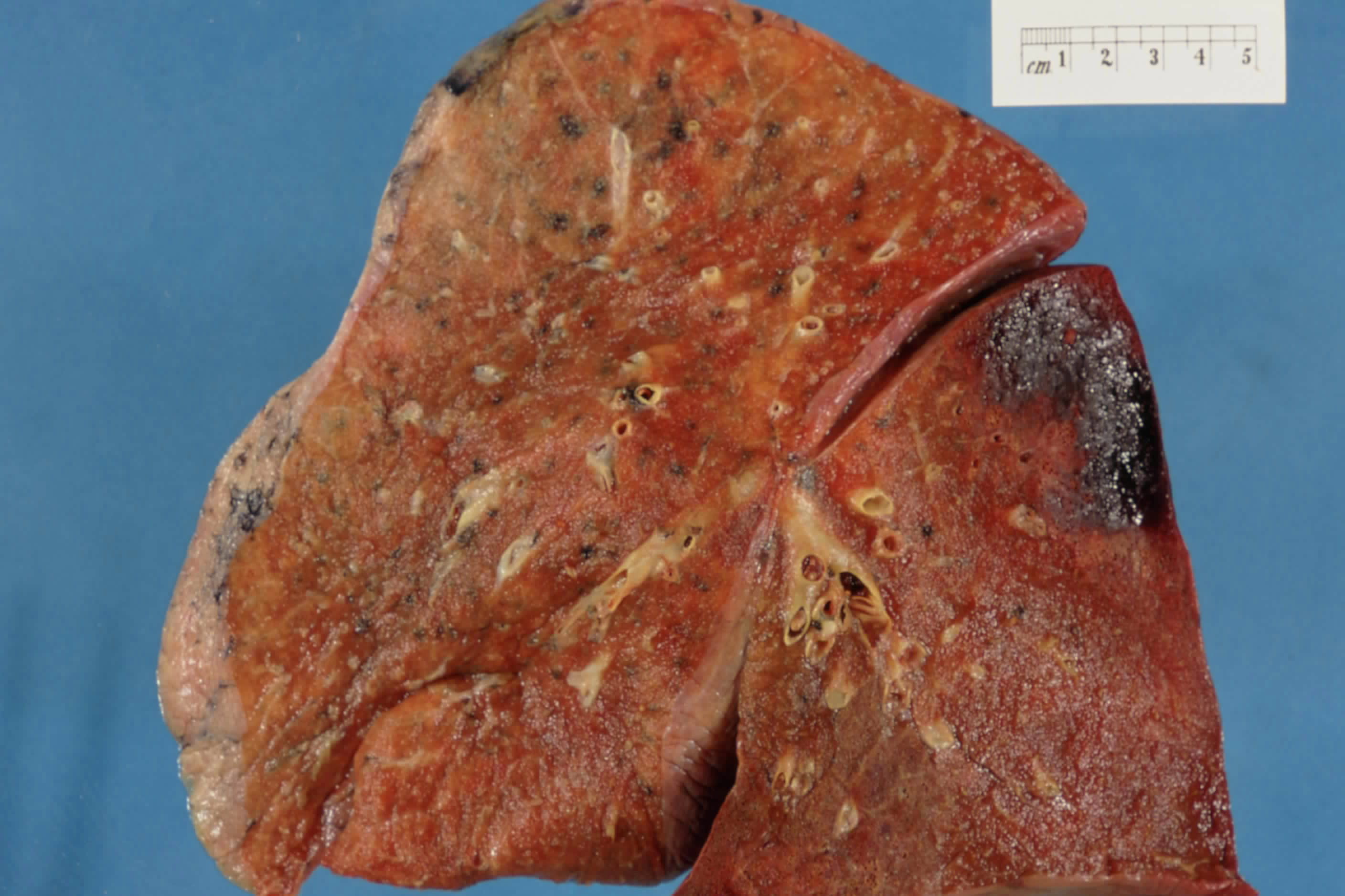
Thrombotic embolism, branch left pulmonary artery, hemorrhagic infarction apex left lower lobe.

An embolism is the lodging of an embolus, a blockage-causing piece of material, inside a blood vessel. The embolus may be a blood clot (thrombus), a fat globule (fat embolism), a bubble of air or other gas (gas embolism), amniotic fluid (amniotic fluid embolism), or foreign material.

An embolism can cause partial or total blockage of blood flow in the affected vessel. Such a blockage (vascular occlusion) may affect a part of the body distant from the origin of the embolus. An embolism in which the embolus is a piece of thrombus is called a thromboembolism.

An embolism is usually a pathological event, caused by illness or injury. Sometimes it is created intentionally for a therapeutic reason, such as to stop bleeding or to kill a cancerous tumor by stopping its blood supply. Such therapy is called embolization.

== Classification ==
There are different types of embolism, some of which are listed below.

Embolism can be classified based on where it enters the circulation, either in arteries or in veins. Arterial embolism are those that follow and, if not dissolved on the way, lodge in a more distal part of the systemic circulation. Sometimes, multiple classifications apply; for instance a pulmonary embolism is classified as an arterial embolism as well, because the clot follows the pulmonary artery carrying deoxygenated blood away from the heart. However, pulmonary embolism is generally classified as a form of venous embolism, because the embolus forms in veins, e.g. deep vein thrombosis.

=== Arterial ===
Arterial embolism can cause occlusion in any part of the body. It is a major cause of infarction (tissue death from blockage of the blood supply).

An embolus lodging in the brain from either the heart or a carotid artery will most likely be the cause of a stroke due to ischemia.

An arterial embolus might originate in the heart (from a thrombus in the left atrium, following atrial fibrillation or be a septic embolus resulting from endocarditis). Emboli of cardiac origin are frequently encountered in clinical practice. Thrombus formation within the atrium occurs mainly in patients with mitral valve disease, and especially in those with mitral valve stenosis (narrowing), with atrial fibrillation (AF). In the absence of AF, pure mitral regurgitation has a low incidence of thromboembolism.

The risk of emboli forming in AF depends on other risk factors such as age, hypertension, diabetes, recent heart failure, or previous stroke. Thrombus formation can also take place within the ventricles, and it occurs in approximately 30% of anterior-wall myocardial infarctions, compared with only 5% of inferior ones. Some other risk factors are poor ejection fraction (<35%), size of infarct, and the presence of AF. In the first three months after infarction, left-ventricle aneurysms have a 10% risk of emboli forming. Patients with prosthetic valves also carry a significant increase in risk of thromboembolism. Risk varies, based on the valve type (bioprosthetic or mechanical); the position (mitral or aortic); and the presence of other factors such as AF, left-ventricular dysfunction, and previous emboli.

Emboli often have more serious consequences when they occur in the so-called "end circulation": areas of the body that have no redundant blood supply, such as the brain and heart.

=== Venous ===
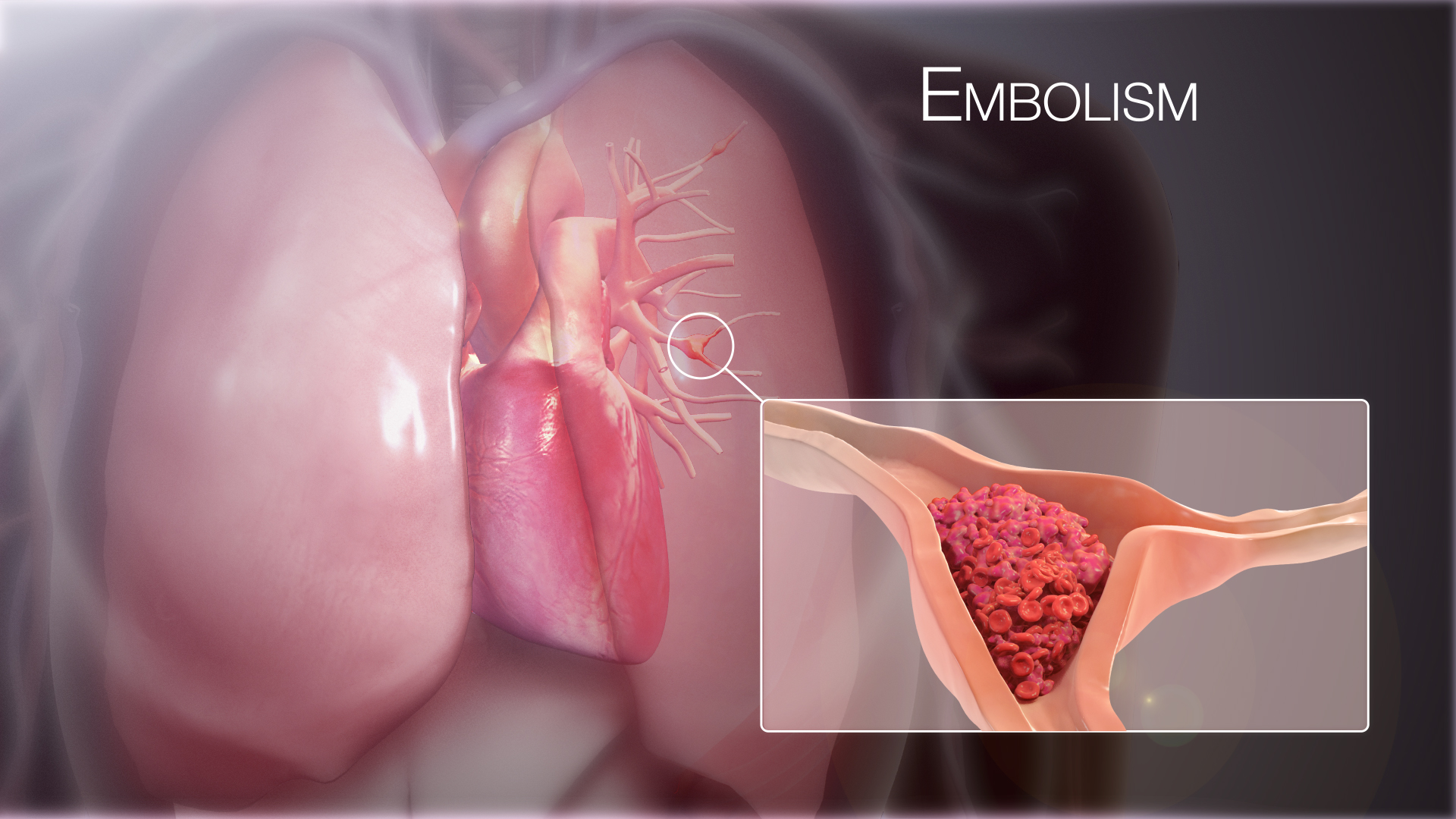
Still from a 3D medical animation showing a pulmonary embolism

Assuming a normal circulation, an embolus formed in a systemic vein will always impact in the lungs, after passing through the right side of the heart. This will form a pulmonary embolism that will result in a blockage of the main artery of the lung and can be a complication of deep-vein thrombosis. The most common sites of origin of pulmonary emboli are the femoral veins. The deep veins of the calf are the most common sites of actual thrombi.

=== Paradoxical (venous to arterial) ===
In paradoxical embolism, also known as crossed embolism, an embolus from the veins crosses to the arterial blood system. This is generally found only with heart problems such as septal defects (holes in the cardiac septum) between the atria or ventricles. The most common such abnormality is patent foramen ovale, occurring in about 25% of the adult population, but here the defect functions as a valve which is normally closed, because pressure is slightly higher in the left side of the heart. Sometimes, for example if a patient coughs just when an embolus is passing, it might cross to the arterial system.

=== Direction ===
The direction of the embolus can be one of two types:

- Anterograde
- Retrograde

In anterograde embolism, the movement of emboli is in the direction of blood flow. In retrograde embolism, the emboli move in opposition to the blood flow direction; this is usually significant only in blood vessels with low pressure (veins) or with emboli of high weight.

== Etymology ==
"Embolism" is first recorded in English in the 14th century and originally meant "intercalcation" or "insertion of days into a calendar"; it came from the Old French embolisme, with the same meaning, and is ultimately derived from the Ancient Greek prefix ἐν (en), meaning "in", and root βάλλειν (ballein), meaning "to throw". The first recorded use of "embolism" in the specific medical sense is from 1855.

== See also ==
- Embolectomy
