= Acute abdomen =

Sudden, severe abdominal pain

- Specialty: Gastroenterology

An acute abdomen refers to a sudden, severe abdominal pain. It is in many cases a medical emergency, requiring urgent and specific diagnosis. Several causes need immediate surgical treatment.

== Differential diagnosis ==
Common causes of an acute abdomen include a gastrointestinal perforation, peptic ulcer disease, mesenteric ischemia, acute cholecystitis, appendicitis, diverticulitis, pancreatitis, and an abdominal hemorrhage. However, this is a non-exhaustive list and other less common causes may also lead to an acute abdomen. In pregnant patient, a tubo-ovarian abscess, ruptured ovarian cyst or a ruptured ectopic pregnancy are common causes of an acute abdomen.

=== Ischemic acute abdomen ===
Vascular disorders are more likely to affect the small bowel than the large bowel. Arterial supply to the intestines is provided by the superior and inferior mesenteric arteries (SMA and IMA respectively), both of which are direct branches of the aorta.

Clinically, patients present with diffuse abdominal pain, bowel distention, and bloody diarrhea. On physical exam, bowel sounds will be absent. Laboratory tests reveal a neutrophilic leukocytosis, sometimes with a left shift, and increased serum amylase. Abdominal radiography will show many air-fluid levels, as well as widespread edema. Acute ischemic abdomen is a surgical emergency. Typically, treatment involves removal of the region of the bowel that has undergone infarction, and subsequent anastomosis of the remaining healthy tissue.

== Diagnosis ==
Traditionally, the use of opiates or other pain medications in patients with an acute abdomen has been discouraged before the clinical examination because of the concern that pain medications may mask the signs and symptoms of the condition and therefore may lead to a delay in diagnosis. However, the scientific literature has shown that early administration of pain medications, including opiates, in those with acute abdomen does not lead to delayed diagnosis, delayed treatment or errors in management (the incorrect surgical treatment administered or performing un-necessary surgery). In a meta-analysis of those with acute appendicitis, early administration of opiates was found to alter treatment approach (with a slightly higher rate of appendectomy in those who received opiates) but diagnostic accuracy and surgical outcomes were unaffected by pain medication use. Clinical guidelines also recommend early analgesic use before a cause is established.

Medical imaging aids in the diagnosis of potential causes of an acute abdomen. A CT scan or ultrasound of the abdomen and pelvis are the preferred imaging modalities in the evaluate of an acute abdomen. The use of radiocontrast agents with CT scans improve diagnostic accuracy. Some authors advocate for the use of CT angiography with contrast of the abdomen and pelvis as the preferred imaging modality. An ultrasound is the preferred imaging modality in pregnant patients as CT scans expose the fetus to ionizing radiation which may lead to adverse pregnancy outcomes. An abdominal x-ray may show free air in the abdominal cavity due to a perforation in the gastrointestinal tract. However, abdominal x-ray is not recommended as part of the diagnostic evaluation in acute abdomen due to its low sensitivity and specificity. Delays in medical imaging acquisition and interpretation greater than 2 hours are associated with an increased risk of complications and death.

== Society and culture ==
In a population based study of Medicare patients in the United States, Black patients who were admitted to the hospital for an acute abdomen requiring general surgery consultation were 14% less likely to receive surgical consultation as compared to White patients. These racial disparities in care persisted (with an 11% difference) when socioeconomic factors were standardized. In another population based study in the United States, Black patients and patients from other racial minority groups were 22-30% less likely to receive pain medication for an acute abdomen as compared to White patients.
