= Bowel infarction =

Injury to the intestine resulting from insufficient blood flow

- Other names: Gangrenous bowel
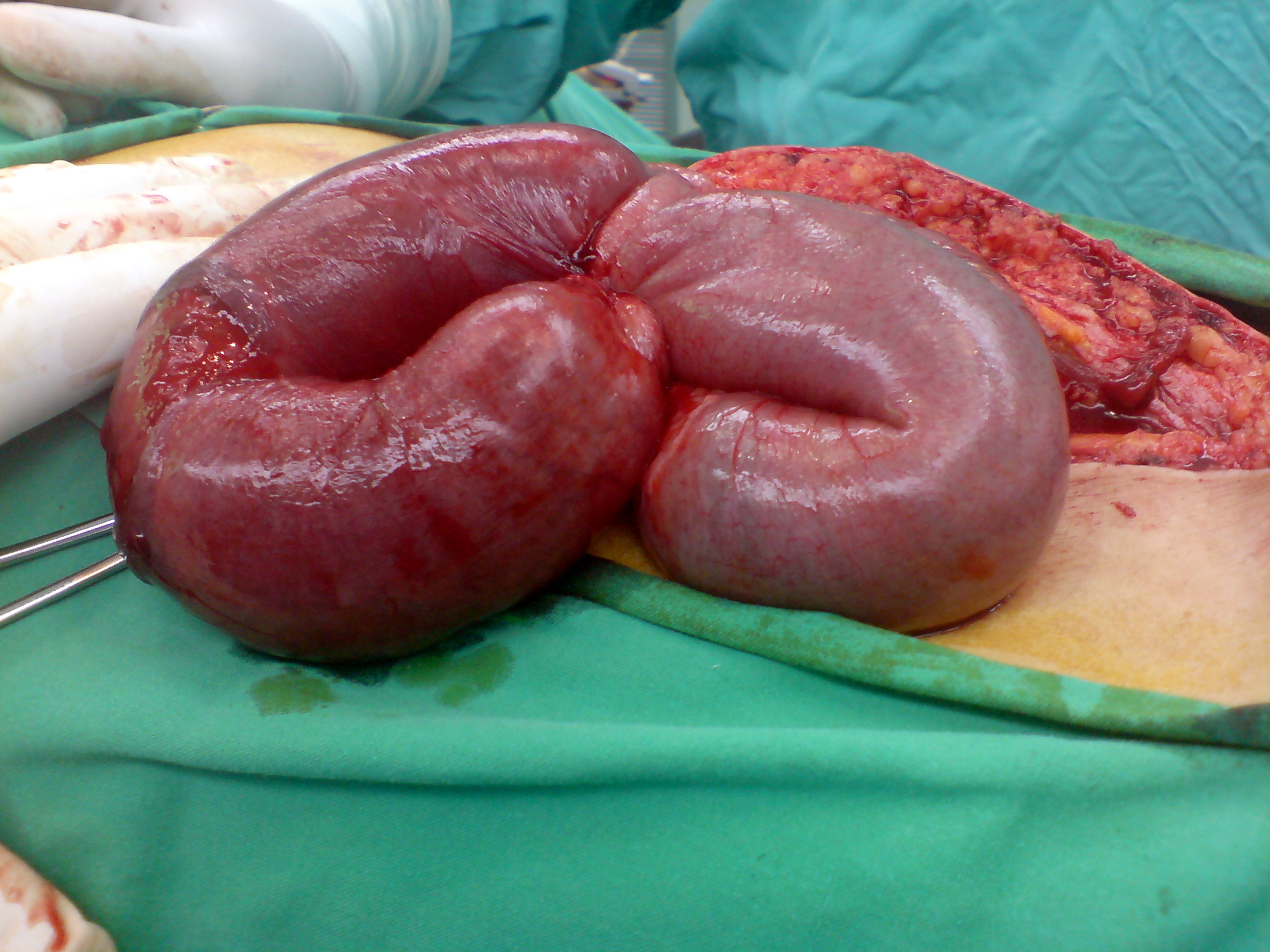
- Intestinal obstruction. Note the tense wall indicative of gas under pressure and volvulus.

Bowel infarction or gangrenous bowel represents an irreversible injury to the intestine resulting from insufficient blood flow. It is considered a medical emergency because it can quickly result in life-threatening infection and death. Any cause of bowel ischemia, the earlier reversible form of injury, may ultimately lead to infarction if uncorrected. The causes of bowel ischemia or infarction include primary vascular causes (for example, mesenteric ischemia) and other causes of bowel obstruction.

== Signs and symptoms ==
Symptoms include severe abdominal pain.

== Causes ==
Primary vascular causes of bowel infarction, also known as mesenteric ischemia, are due to blockages in the arteries or veins that supply the bowel. Types of mesenteric ischemia are generally separated into acute and chronic processes, because this helps determine treatment and prognosis.

Bowel obstruction is most often caused by intestinal adhesions, which frequently form after abdominal surgeries, or by chronic infections such as diverticulitis, hepatitis, and inflammatory bowel disease. The condition may be difficult to diagnose, as the symptoms may resemble those of other bowel disorders. Bowel volvulus describes a specific form of bowel obstruction, where the intestine and/or mesentery are twisted, resulting in ischemia.

== Management ==
The only treatment for bowel infarction is immediate surgical repair and eventually removal of the dead bowel segment.

Patients who have undergone extensive resection of the small bowel may develop malabsorption, indicating the need for dietary supplements.

== Additional images ==
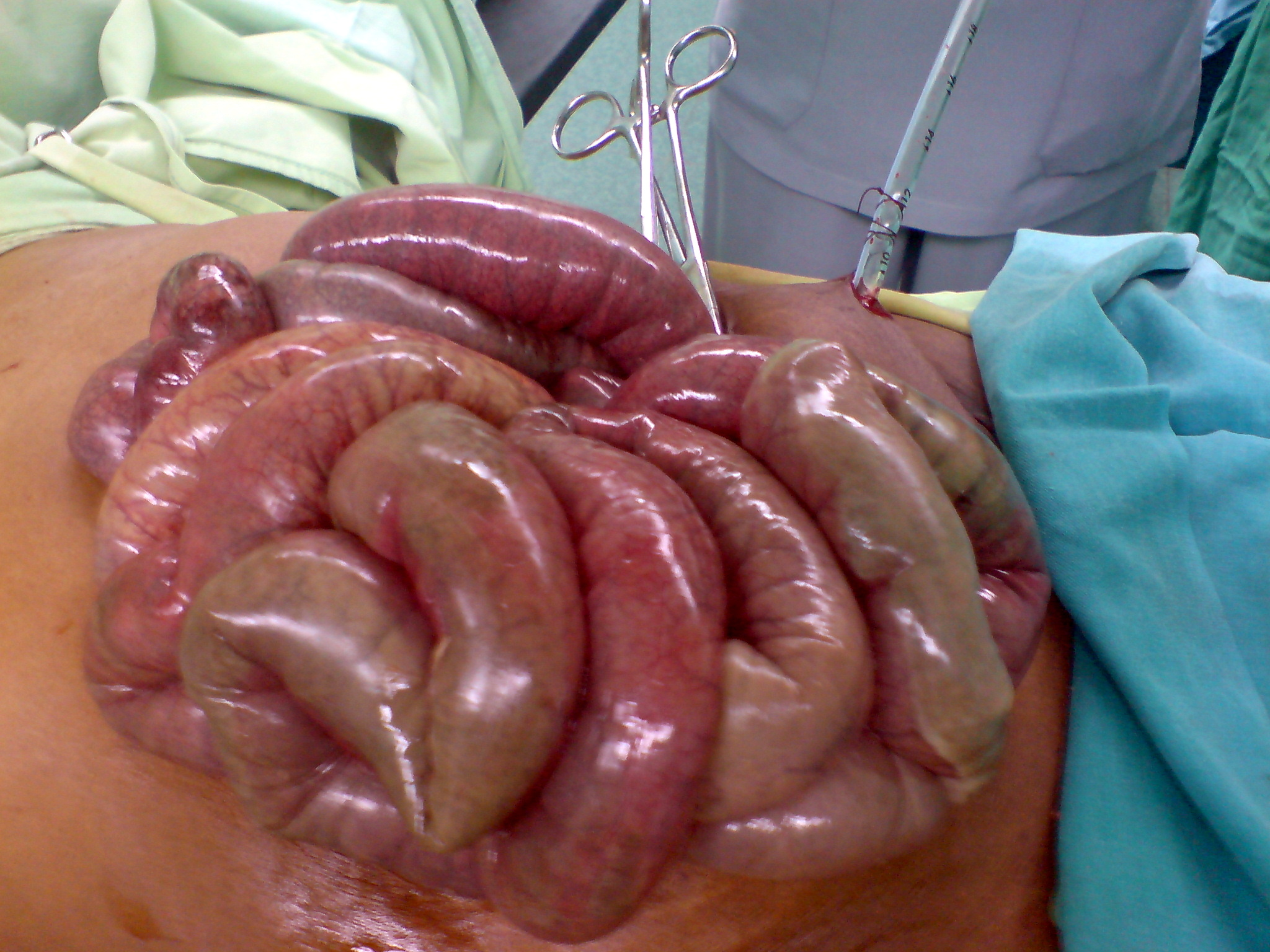
Bowel infarction. Note the grey discoloration.

== See also ==
- Adhesions
- Ischemic colitis
- Volvulus
