= Neonatal encephalopathy =

Neurological dysfunction shortly after birth

- Other names: Hypoxic and ischemic brain injury in the newborn, perinatal asphyxia, neonatal hypoxic and ischemic brain injury
- Specialty: Pediatrics
- Frequency: 0.005%

Neonatal encephalopathy (NE), previously known as neonatal hypoxic-ischemic encephalopathy (neonatal HIE or NHIE), is defined as a encephalopathy syndrome with signs and symptoms of abnormal neurological function, in the first few days of life in an infant born after 35 weeks of gestation. In this condition there is difficulty initiating and maintaining respirations, a subnormal level of consciousness, and associated depression of tone, reflexes, and possibly seizures. Hypoxia refers to deficiency of oxygen, Ischemia refers to restriction in blood flow to the brain. The result is "encephalopathy" which refers to damaged brain cells. Encephalopathy is a nonspecific response of the brain to injury which may occur via multiple methods, but is commonly caused by birth asphyxia, leading to cerebral hypoxia.

== Signs and symptoms ==
In neonates born at or beyond 35 weeks, neonatal encephalopathy may present itself as the following symptoms:

- Reduced level of consciousness
- Seizures (which peak at 48 hours)
- Difficulty initiating and maintaining respiration
- Depression of tone and reflexes

== Diagnosis ==
Cord blood gas analysis can be used to determine if there is perinatal hypoxia/asphyxia, which are potential causes of hypoxic-ischemic encephalopathy or cerebral palsy, and give insight into causes of intrapartum fetal distress. Cord blood gas analysis is indicated for high-risk pregnancies, in cases where C-sections occurred due to fetal compromise, if there were abnormal fetal heart rate patterns, Apgar scores of 3 or lower, intrapartum fever, or multifetal gestation.

Evidence of brain injury related to the hypoxic-ischemic events that cause neonatal encephalopathy can be seen with brain MRIs, CTs, magnetic resonance spectroscopy imaging or ultrasounds. Neonatal encephalopathy may be assessed using Sarnat staging. Brain MRI is usually performed within eight days of life. Features that can be seen on MRI brain are: periventricular leukomalacia, basal ganglia and thalamus lesions, and multicystic encephalopathy. Besides that, diffusion MRI would show low apparent diffusion coefficient (ADC) values in the first seven days of life. This is followed by pseudonormalisation of ADC values (normalisation of ADC values despite having persistent underlying brain injuries) which can persists up to two weeks.

== Treatment ==
In the past, treatment options were limited to supportive medical therapy. Currently, neonatal encephalopathy is treated using hypothermia therapy. This has been shown to reduce brain damage, reduce future disability, and improve survival. Hypothermia therapy is also sometimes termed hypothermic neural rescue therapy. Clinical trials are taking place to investigate the effectiveness of stem cell-based interventions, which are thought to have the potential to reduce mortality and improve the long-term development of newborn infants with neonatal encephalopathy.

== Prognosis ==
HIE is a major predictor of neurodevelopmental disability in term infants. 25 percent have permanent neurological deficits.

== Epidemiology ==
Overall, the relative incidence of neonatal encephalopathy is estimated to be between 2 and 9 per 1000 term births. 40% to 60% of affected infants die by 2 years old or have severe disabilities. In 2013 it was estimated to have resulted in 644,000 deaths down from 874,000 deaths in 1990.
