= Hypothermia cap =

Medical device to cool the human scalp

A hypothermia cap (also referred to as cold cap or cooling cap) is a therapeutic device used to cool the human scalp. Its most prominent medical applications are in preventing or reducing alopecia in chemotherapy, and for preventing cerebral palsy in babies born with neonatal encephalopathy caused by hypoxic-ischemic encephalopathy (HIE). It can also be used to provide neuroprotection after cardiac arrest, to inhibit stroke paralysis, and as cryotherapy for migraine headaches.

Worn tight on the head, hypothermia caps are typically made of a synthetic such as neoprene, silicone or polyurethane, and filled with a coolant agent such as ice or gel which is either frozen to a very cold temperature (−25 to −30 °C (−13 to −22 °F)) before application or continuously cooled by an auxiliary control unit.

In the United States a course of treatment may cost US$1,500 to US$3,000.

== Medical uses ==
=== Neonatal encephalopathy ===
Hypoxic ischemic encephalopathy (HIE) is a condition that occurs when the brain is deprived of an adequate oxygen supply, and is most commonly observed in newborn babies due to birth asphyxia. It is the leading cause of cerebral palsy, an irreversible neonatal brain injury that can result in long-term cognitive, motor, and visual impairments. About 10,000 babies are born each year with cerebral palsy.

In such cases, by slowing down cell metabolism and body functions, a hypothermic cap can be used to lessen a baby's need for oxygen. Research throughout the late 1990s and 2000s demonstrated that for every degree a baby's body temperature is lowered, its body functions and demand for energy slow down by 10 to 15 percent. Therefore, slowing metabolic demands through hypothermia therapy can rectify a mismatch between oxygen supply and cell need, lowering the risk for cerebral palsy.

Among babies who meet the criteria for hypothermia therapy—full-term with no known pre-existing conditions, having neonatal distress, and an abnormal neurological exam—cooling must begin within six hours of birth and body temperature must be maintained at 33–34 °C (91–93 °F) for 72 hours before being gradually warmed again. An alternative to hypothermia caps involves pumping cold water through a specially adapted blanket, cooling the whole body.

Induced pediatric hypothermia was approved in the U.S. by the FDA in March 2007. The most prominent such hypothermia cap which utilizes a cooling unit, a control unit and temperature probes to maintain a steady flow of cool water through a cap covering the head.

=== Cardiac arrest ===
A 2008 trial demonstrated that the pre-hospital induction of therapeutic hypothermia after cardiac arrest as soon as possible after return of spontaneous circulation (ROSC) can achieve optimal neuroprotective benefit. The hypothermia cap was applied to 20 patients after out-of-hospital cardiac arrest, with a median of 10 min after ROSC. The median time between initiation of cooling and hospital admission was 28 minutes. No side effects related to the hypothermia cap were observed. The study concluded that "prehospital use of hypothermia caps is a safe and effective procedure to start therapeutic hypothermia after cardiac arrest. This approach is rapidly available, inexpensive, non-invasive, easy to learn and applicable in almost any situation."

=== Chemotherapy-induced hair loss ===
Hypothermia caps appear useful to prevent hair loss during some kinds of chemotherapy, specifically when taxanes or anthracyclines are used. It should not be used when cancer is present in the skin of the scalp or in people with lymphoma or leukemia. There are generally only minor side effects from treatment.

The first U.S. patent, filed in 1979 and granted in 1984, was for Mark Barron's "Chemo Cap", which consisted of resizable gel-filled nylon pouches that were frozen and worn for 15 to 20 minutes prior to treatment. However, studies throughout the 1980s and early 1990s were not sufficiently encouraging, and the patent expired in 1998. An analysis of 53 studies from 1995 through 2003, however, showed an average success rate of 73%.

Today there are two types of caps; Manual cold caps sometimes referred to as 'Cold Caps/Cold Capping' & machine cooling often referred to as 'Scalp Cooling' However they can be used interchangeably.

There are three major providers of scalp cooling; Penguin Cold Cap, Paxman & Dignitana.

=== Other uses ===
The use of hypothermia caps has also shown promise in inhibiting stroke paralysis. Studies are underway testing a combination treatment consisting of four drugs plus a hypothermia cap to try to slow the cell death that is triggered by an ischemic stroke. Ischemic strokes are caused when a clot blocks blood flow to the brain, and comprise roughly 80% of all strokes. The slowing of cell death is theorized to give the brain time to find an alternate blood supply through unblocked arteries, meaning patients may potentially avoid physical and speech impairments caused by ischemic strokes.

Numerous studies have also suggested that therapeutic hypothermia can provide safe and effective adjunctive treatment for migraine headaches. For instance, a 1989 study in Headache: The Journal of Head and Face Pain showed 64.5% of 45 patients with migraine or migraine plus chronic daily headache evaluated use of a cold wrap for 20 to 30 minutes as mildly, moderately or completely effective. In a 1984 study using a frozen gel pack, 80% of migraine patients reported the pack was effective. Numerous over-the-counter hypothermia caps today offer therapy for headaches.

== Side effects ==
In tests, minor cardiac arrhythmias occurred slightly more often in cooled infants, however the effect was not unexpected because mild sinus bradycardia is known to be associated with hypothermia. In tests, all cases were resolved with appropriate therapy. The cold cap system also increased the incidence of scalp edema; however, all cases were resolved prior to or after completion of treatment.

== See also ==
- Therapeutic hypothermia
