= Hagberg =

Hagberg may refer to:

== People ==
- Brita Hagberg (1756–1825), a woman who served as a soldier in the Swedish army during the Russo-Swedish War
- Carl August Hagberg (1810–1864), a Swedish linguist and translator
- Christin Hagberg (born 1958), a Swedish social democratic politician
- David Hagberg (born 1942), a prolific American novelist
- Edvin Hagberg (1875–1947), a Swedish sailor who competed in the 1908 and 1912 Summer Olympics
- Garry L. Hagberg, an author, professor, philosopher, and jazz musician
- Göran Hagberg (born 1947), a former Swedish football goalkeeper
- Henrik Hagberg (born 1975), a Swedish Bandy player who currently plays for Sandvikens AIK as a midfielder
- Hilding Hagberg (1899–1993), a Swedish communist politician
- Justin Hagberg, a guitarist of Canadian heavy metal band 3 Inches of Blood
- Liselott Hagberg (born 1958), a Swedish Liberal People's Party politician
- Michael Hagberg (born 1954), a Swedish social democratic politician
- Oscar Hagberg, the 25th head college football coach for the United States Naval Academy Midshipmen located in Annapolis, Maryland
- Sven Hagberg, one of the creators of the Falling Number test
- Charles Theodore Hagberg Wright (1862–1940), English librarian informally called Hagberg

== Places ==
- Hagberg (Welzheim Forest), a hill in the Swabian-Franconian Forest, Baden-Württemberg, Germany
- Hagberg, a village in the municipality of Mank, Melk District, Lower Austria

== See also ==
- Hagenberg
