= Mark B. Barron =

American inventor

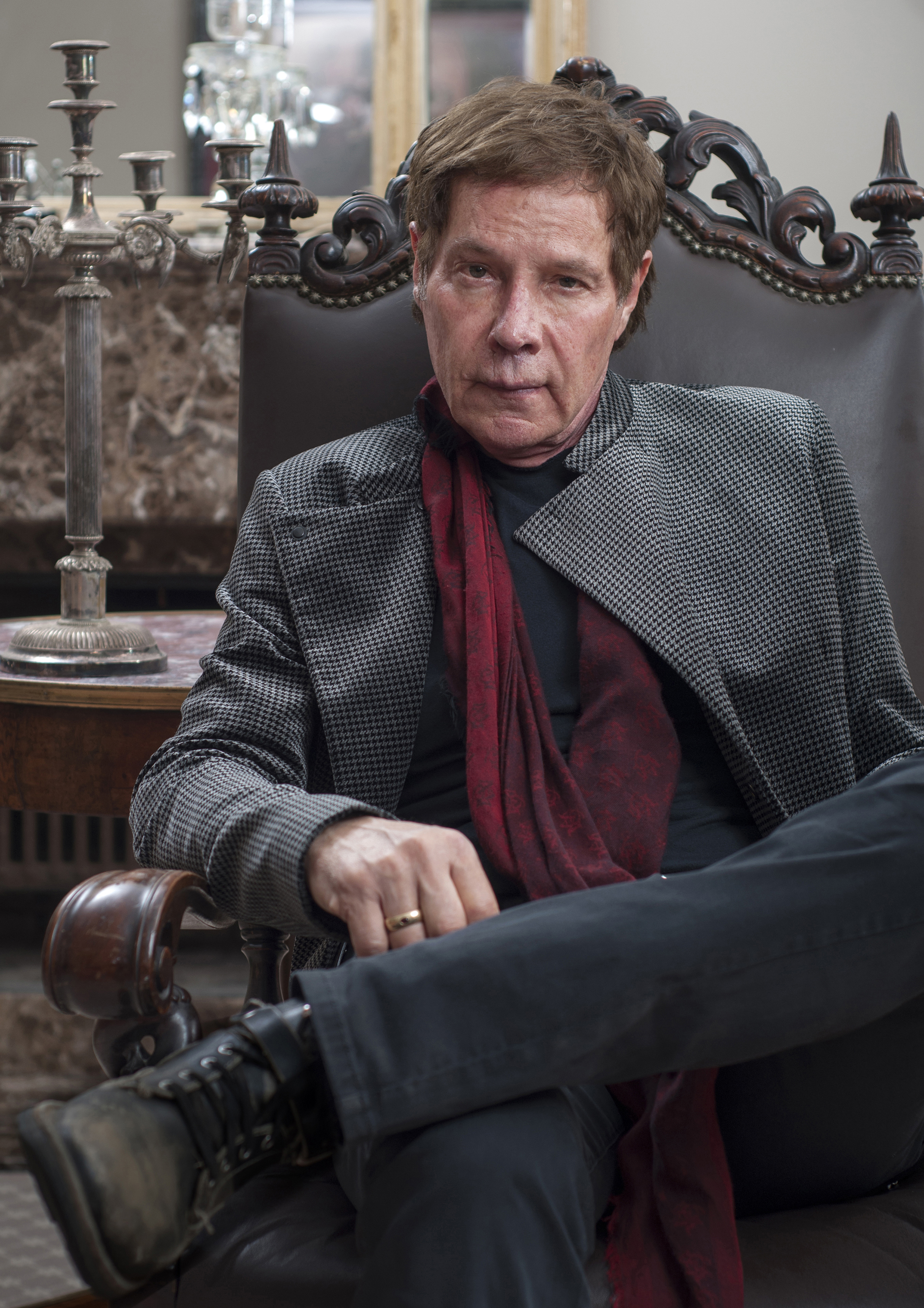
- Mark B. Barron, Bel Air, California on May 1, 2016
- Born: Mark Bowen; January 15, 1958 (age 68)
- Occupations: Entrepreneur, Inventor, Futurist

Mark B. Barron (born Mark Bowen; 1958) is an American entrepreneur and inventor. He is the founder of Public Transportation Safety International Corporation (PTS), which invented and produces the S-1 Gard Dangerzone Deflector for transit buses and the Minimize Danger Zone (MDZ) Shield for school buses.

== Early life ==
Mark Barron was born in San Diego, California. At the age of five, he and his family relocated to Los Angeles, CA. His parents were divorced by the time he was eleven years old; subsequently, he was sent to reform school.

== Professional life ==
Barron is who invented and patented the Chemo Cap, a therapeutic hypothermic device, in 1979. The Chemo Cap was designed to prevent alopecia from chemotherapy treatment by freezing the scalp and decreasing blood flow to areas of hair growth during administration of the drug. While success was initially limited, more recent "cold caps" have recently achieved more widespread adoption and shown success rates of 80 to 90 percent with certain chemotherapy regimens, in addition to helping prevent cerebral palsy in babies, providing neuroprotection after cardiac arrest, inhibiting stroke paralysis, and as cryotherapy for migraine headaches.

In subsequent years, he launched ventures in long-distance telecommunications and legal referral consulting.

In 2025, Barron founded and developed Trust Fund Battle, an educational gaming platform focused on youth decision-making and incarceration prevention.

=== Public Transportation Safety Int'l Corp. ===
In 1994, Barron invented the S-1 Gard Dangerzone Deflector and founded Public Transportation Safety International. The S-1 Gard is a device installed in front of the dual right rear wheels of transit buses, engineered to deflect a person out of the path of the wheels, preventing injury or death. It is currently installed on bus fleets in major cities such as Los Angeles, Washington D.C., Chicago and Baltimore.

In 2010, PTS launched the MDZ Shield as an alternative to the S-1 Gard for school buses.

=== Bel Air X ===
Bel Air X is an on-demand telepresent service application which utilizes personal assistants who will go to stores or merchants and purchase items for consumers. Bel Air X is unique in that the personal assistant can transmit images of the items via an imaging capturing device from the store to the consumer so they can see what the item looks like as if the consumer was actually there in-person. The assistant can also show other similar products to the consumer if they prefer to make product substitutions.

== Personal life ==
In 2005, Barron purchased the home of music producer Quincy Jones in the Bel-Air section of Los Angeles. The home was previously occupied by singer Connie Francis, and later singer Julio Iglesias, who made it famous in 1984 by naming his multi-platinum album 1100 Bel Air Place after the home. In 2010, Mark Bowen legally changed his name to Mark Bowen Barron.
