= MDZ =

MDZ may refer to:

- MDZ Shield, a device on American school buses to prevent people from falling under the wheels
- Michael Del Zotto, ice hockey player for the Anaheim Ducks
- Munich Digitization Center of the Bavarian State Library, Germany
- Governor Francisco Gabrielli International Airport, Argentina, IATA code MDZ
- Taylor County Airport (Wisconsin), FAA code MDZ
