= Mir-711 microRNA precursor family =

mir-711

Identifiers
- Symbol: mir-711
- Rfam: RF01923
- miRBase family: MIPF0000748

Other data
- RNA type: microRNA
- Domain(s): Eukaryota;
- PDB structures: PDBe

In molecular biology mir-711 microRNA is a short RNA molecule. MicroRNAs function to regulate the expression levels of other genes by several mechanisms.

== Diagnostic use in Cutaneous T-cell Lymphoma ==
miR-711 is able to distinguish between malignant cutaneous T-cell lymphomas and benign skin disorders with high accuracy.

== Hsp70.3 and Further Regulation ==
miR-711 has been found to target and suppress Heat Shock Protein 70.3 in vitro at a post-transcriptional level via its 3' untranslated region. Ischaemic preconditioning brings about reduced miR-711 levels, with downregulated cardiac myocyte levels further dependent upon NF-kappa B.

== See also ==
- MicroRNA
