= Targeted temperature management =

Medical procedure

- Other names: Therapeutic hypothermia
- Specialty: Critical care medicine
- ICD-10-PCS: 6A4
- MeSH: C18.452.394.750
- OPS-301 code: 8-607

Targeted temperature management (TTM), previously known as therapeutic hypothermia or protective hypothermia, is an active treatment that tries to achieve and maintain a specific body temperature in a person for a specific duration of time in an effort to improve health outcomes during recovery after a period of stopped blood flow to the brain. This is done in an attempt to reduce the risk of tissue injury following lack of blood flow. Periods of poor blood flow may be due to cardiac arrest or the blockage of an artery by a clot as in the case of a stroke.

Targeted temperature management improves survival and brain function following resuscitation from cardiac arrest. Evidence supports its use following certain types of cardiac arrest in which an individual does not regain consciousness. The target temperature is often between 32 and 34 °C. Targeted temperature management following traumatic brain injury is of unclear benefit. While associated with some complications, these are generally mild.

Targeted temperature management is thought to prevent brain injury by several methods, including decreasing the brain's oxygen demand, reducing the production of neurotransmitters like glutamate, as well as reducing free radicals that might damage the brain. Body temperature may be lowered by many means, including cooling blankets, cooling helmets, cooling catheters, ice packs and ice water lavage.

== Medical uses ==
Targeted temperature management may be used in the following conditions:

=== Cardiac arrest ===
The 2013 ILCOR and 2010 American Heart Association guidelines support the use of cooling following resuscitation from cardiac arrest. These recommendations were largely based on two trials from 2002 which showed improved survival and brain function when cooled to 32–34 °C (90–93 °F) after cardiac arrest.

However, more recent research suggests that there is no benefit to cooling to 33 °C (91 °F) when compared with less aggressive cooling only to a near-normal temperature of 36 °C (97 °F); it appears cooling is effective because it prevents fever, a common complication seen after cardiac arrest. There is no difference in long term quality of life following mild compared to more severe cooling.

In children, following cardiac arrest, cooling does not appear useful as of 2018.

A recent Cochrane Review summarized available evidence on the topic and found that targeted temperature management around 33 °C may increase the chance to prevent brain damage after cardiac arrest by 40%.

=== Neonatal encephalopathy ===
Hypothermia therapy for neonatal encephalopathy has been proven to improve outcomes for newborn infants affected by perinatal hypoxia-ischemia, hypoxic ischemic encephalopathy or birth asphyxia. A 2013 Cochrane review found that it is useful in full term babies with encephalopathy. Whole body or selective head cooling to 33–34 °C (91–93 °F), begun within six hours of birth and continued for 72 hours, reduces mortality and reduces cerebral palsy and neurological deficits in survivors.

=== Open heart surgery ===
Targeted temperature management is used during open-heart surgery because it decreases the metabolic needs of the brain, heart, and other organs, reducing the risk of damage to them. The patient is given medication to prevent shivering. The body is then cooled to 25–32 °C (77–90 °F). The heart is stopped and an external heart-lung pump maintains circulation to the patient's body. The heart is cooled further and is maintained at a temperature below 15 °C (59 °F) for the duration of the surgery. This very cold temperature helps the heart muscle to tolerate its lack of blood supply during the surgery.

== Adverse effects ==
Possible complications may include: infection, bleeding, dysrhythmias and high blood sugar. One review found an increased risk of pneumonia and sepsis but not the overall risk of infection. Another review found a trend towards increased bleeding but no increase in severe bleeding. Hypothermia induces a "cold diuresis" which can lead to electrolyte abnormalities – specifically hypokalemia, hypomagnesaemia, and hypophosphatemia, as well as hypovolemia.

== Mechanism ==
The earliest rationale for the effects of hypothermia as a neuroprotectant focused on the slowing of cellular metabolism resulting from a drop in body temperature. For every one degree Celsius drop in body temperature, cellular metabolism slows by 5–7%. Accordingly, most early hypotheses suggested that hypothermia reduces the harmful effects of ischemia by decreasing the body's need for oxygen. The initial emphasis on cellular metabolism explains why the early studies almost exclusively focused on the application of deep hypothermia, as these researchers believed that the therapeutic effects of hypothermia correlated directly with the extent of temperature decline.

In the special case of infants with perinatal asphyxia, it appears that apoptosis is a prominent cause of cell death and that hypothermia therapy for neonatal encephalopathy interrupts the apoptotic pathway. In general, cell death is not directly caused by oxygen deprivation, but occurs indirectly as a result of the cascade of subsequent events. Cells need oxygen to create ATP, a molecule used by cells to store energy, and cells need ATP to regulate intracellular ion levels. ATP is used to fuel both the importation of ions necessary for cellular function and the removal of ions that are harmful to cellular function. Without oxygen, cells cannot manufacture the necessary ATP to regulate ion levels and thus cannot prevent the intracellular environment from approaching the ion concentration of the outside environment. It is not oxygen deprivation itself that precipitates cell death, but rather without oxygen the cell can not make the ATP it needs to regulate ion concentrations and maintain homeostasis.

Notably, even a small drop in temperature encourages cell membrane stability during periods of oxygen deprivation. For this reason, a drop in body temperature helps prevent an influx of unwanted ions during an ischemic insult. By making the cell membrane more impermeable, hypothermia helps prevent the cascade of reactions set off by oxygen deprivation. Even moderate dips in temperature strengthen the cellular membrane, helping to minimize any disruption to the cellular environment. It is by moderating the disruption of homeostasis caused by a blockage of blood flow that many now postulate, results in hypothermia's ability to minimize the trauma resultant from ischemic injuries.

Targeted temperature management may also help to reduce reperfusion injury, damage caused by oxidative stress when the blood supply is restored to a tissue after a period of ischemia. Various inflammatory immune responses occur during reperfusion. These inflammatory responses cause increased intracranial pressure, which leads to cell injury and in some situations, cell death. Hypothermia has been shown to help moderate intracranial pressure and therefore to minimize the harmful effects of a patient's inflammatory immune responses during reperfusion. The oxidation that occurs during reperfusion also increases free radical production. Since hypothermia reduces both intracranial pressure and free radical production, this might be yet another mechanism of action for hypothermia's therapeutic effect. Overt activation of N-methyl-D-aspartate (NMDA) receptors following brain injuries can lead to calcium entry which triggers neuronal death via the mechanisms of excitotoxicity.

== Methods ==
There are a number of methods through which hypothermia is induced. These include: cooling catheters, cooling blankets, and application of ice applied around the body among others. As of 2013 it is unclear if one method is any better than the others. While cool intravenous fluid may be given to start the process, further methods are required to keep the person cold.

Core body temperature must be measured (either via the esophagus, rectum, bladder in those who are producing urine, or within the pulmonary artery) to guide cooling. A temperature below 30 °C (86 °F) should be avoided, as adverse events increase significantly. The person should be kept at the goal temperature plus or minus half a degree Celsius for 24 hours. Rewarming should be done slowly with suggested speeds of 0.1 to 0.5 °C (0.18 to 0.90 °F) per hour.

Targeted temperature management should be started as soon as possible. The goal temperature should be reached before 8 hours. Targeted temperature management remains partially effective even when initiated as long as 6 hours after collapse.

Prior to the induction of targeted temperature management, pharmacological agents to control shivering must be administered. When body temperature drops below a certain threshold—typically around 36 °C (97 °F)—people may begin to shiver. It appears that regardless of the technique used to induce hypothermia, people begin to shiver when temperature drops below this threshold. Drugs commonly used to prevent and treat shivering in targeted temperature management include acetaminophen, buspirone, opioids including pethidine (meperidine), dexmedetomidine, fentanyl, and/or propofol. If shivering is unable to be controlled with these drugs, patients are often placed under general anesthesia and/or are given paralytic medication like vecuronium. People should be rewarmed slowly and steadily in order to avoid harmful spikes in intracranial pressure.

=== Cooling catheters ===
Cooling catheters are inserted into a femoral vein. Cooled saline solution is circulated through either a metal coated tube or a balloon in the catheter. The saline cools the person's whole body by lowering the temperature of a person's blood. Catheters reduce temperature at rates ranging from 1.5 to 2 °C (2.7 to 3.6 °F) per hour. Through the use of the control unit, catheters can bring body temperature to within 0.1 °C (0.18 °F) of the target level. Furthermore, catheters can raise temperature at a steady rate, which helps to avoid harmful rises in intracranial pressure. A number of studies have demonstrated that targeted temperature management via catheter is safe and effective.

Adverse events associated with this invasive technique include bleeding, infection, vascular puncture, and deep vein thrombosis (DVT). Infection caused by cooling catheters is particularly harmful, as resuscitated people are highly vulnerable to the complications associated with infections. Bleeding represents a significant danger, due to a decreased clotting threshold caused by hypothermia. The risk of deep vein thrombosis may be the most pressing medical complication.

Deep vein thrombosis can be characterized as a medical event whereby a blood clot forms in a deep vein, usually the femoral vein. This condition may become potentially fatal if the clot travels to the lungs and causes a pulmonary embolism. Another potential problem with cooling catheters is the potential to block access to the femoral vein, which is a site normally used for a variety of other medical procedures, including angiography of the venous system and the right side of the heart. However, most cooling catheters are triple lumen catheters, and the majority of people post-arrest will require central venous access. Unlike non-invasive methods which can be administered by nurses, the insertion of cooling catheters must be performed by a physician fully trained and familiar with the procedure. The time delay between identifying a person who might benefit from the procedure and the arrival of an interventional radiologist or other physician to perform the insertion may minimize some of the benefit of invasive methods' more rapid cooling.

=== Transnasal evaporative cooling ===
Transnasal evaporative cooling is a method of inducing the hypothermia process and provides a means of continuous cooling of a person throughout the early stages of targeted temperature management and during movement throughout the hospital environment. This technique uses two cannulae, inserted into a person's nasal cavity, to deliver a spray of coolant mist that evaporates directly underneath the brain and base of the skull. As blood passes through the cooling area, it reduces the temperature throughout the rest of the body.

The method is compact enough to be used at the point of cardiac arrest, during ambulance transport, or within the hospital proper. It is intended to reduce rapidly the person's temperature to below 34 °C (93 °F) while targeting the brain as the first area of cooling. Research into the device has shown cooling rates of 2.6 °C (4.7 °F) per hour in the brain (measured through infrared tympanic measurement) and 1.6 °C (2.9 °F) per hour for core body temperature reduction.

=== Water blankets ===
With these technologies, cold water circulates through a blanket, or torso wraparound vest and leg wraps. To lower temperature with optimal speed, 70% of a person's surface area should be covered with water blankets. The treatment represents the most well studied means of controlling body temperature. Water blankets lower a person's temperature exclusively by cooling a person's skin and accordingly require no invasive procedures.

Water blankets possess several undesirable qualities. They are susceptible to leaking, which may represent an electrical hazard since they are operated in close proximity to electrically powered medical equipment. The Food and Drug Administration also has reported several cases of external cooling blankets causing significant burns to the skin of person. Other problems with external cooling include overshoot of temperature (20% of people will have overshoot), slower induction time versus internal cooling, increased compensatory response, decreased patient access, and discontinuation of cooling for invasive procedures such as the cardiac catheterization.

If therapy with water blankets is given along with two litres of cold intravenous saline, people can be cooled to 33 °C (91 °F) in 65 minutes. Most machines now come with core temperature probes. When inserted into the rectum, the core body temperature is monitored and feedback to the machine allows changes in the water blanket to achieve the desired set temperature. In the past some of the models of cooling machines have produced an overshoot in the target temperature and cooled people to levels below 32 °C (90 °F), resulting in increased adverse events. They have also rewarmed patients at too fast a rate, leading to spikes in intracranial pressure. Some of the new models have more software that attempt to prevent this overshoot by utilizing warmer water when the target temperature is close and preventing any overshoot. Some of the new machines now also have 3 rates of cooling and warming; a rewarming rate with one of these machines allows a patient to be rewarmed at a very slow rate of just 0.17 °C (0.31 °F) an hour in the "automatic mode", allowing rewarming from 33 °C (91 °F) to 37 °C (99 °F) over 24 hours.

=== Cool caps ===
There are a number of non-invasive head cooling caps and helmets designed to target cooling at the brain. A hypothermia cap is typically made of a synthetic material such as neoprene, silicone, or polyurethane and filled with a cooling agent such as ice or gel which is either cooled to a very cold temperature, −25 to −30 °C (−13 to −22 °F), before application or continuously cooled by an auxiliary control unit. Their most notable uses are in preventing or reducing alopecia in chemotherapy, and for preventing cerebral palsy in babies born with hypoxic ischemic encephalopathy. In the continuously cooled iteration, coolant is cooled with the aid of a compressor and pumped through the cooling cap. Circulation is regulated by means of valves and temperature sensors in the cap. If the temperature deviates or if other errors are detected, an alarm system is activated. The frozen iteration involves continuous application of caps filled with Crylon gel cooled to −30 °C (−22 °F) to the scalp before, during and after intravenous chemotherapy. As the caps warm on the head, multiple cooled caps must be kept on hand and applied every 20 to 30 minutes.

== History ==
Hypothermia has been applied therapeutically since antiquity. The Greek physician Hippocrates, the namesake of the Hippocratic Oath, advocated the packing of wounded soldiers in snow and ice. Napoleonic surgeon Baron Dominique Jean Larrey recorded that officers who were kept closer to the fire survived less often than the minimally pampered infantrymen. In modern times, the first medical article concerning hypothermia was published in 1945. This study focused on the effects of hypothermia on patients with severe head injury. In the 1950s, hypothermia received its first medical application, being used in intracerebral aneurysm surgery to create a bloodless field. Most of the early research focused on the applications of deep hypothermia, defined as a body temperature of 20–25 °C (68–77 °F). Such an extreme drop in body temperature brings with it a whole host of side effects, which made the use of deep hypothermia impractical in most clinical situations.

This period also saw sporadic investigation of more mild forms of hypothermia, with mild hypothermia being defined as a body temperature of 32–34 °C (90–93 °F). In the 1950s, Doctor Rosomoff demonstrated in dogs the positive effects of mild hypothermia after brain ischemia and traumatic brain injury. In the 1980s further animal studies indicated the ability of mild hypothermia to act as a general neuroprotectant following a blockage of blood flow to the brain. This animal data was supported by two landmark human studies that were published simultaneously in 2002 by the New England Journal of Medicine. Both studies, one occurring in Europe and the other in Australia, demonstrated the positive effects of mild hypothermia applied following cardiac arrest. Responding to this research, in 2003 the American Heart Association (AHA) and the International Liaison Committee on Resuscitation (ILCOR) endorsed the use of targeted temperature management following cardiac arrest. Currently, a growing percentage of hospitals around the world incorporate the AHA/ILCOR guidelines and include hypothermic therapies in their standard package of care for patients with cardiac arrest. Some researchers go so far as to contend that hypothermia represents a better neuroprotectant following a blockage of blood to the brain than any known drug. Over this same period a particularly successful research effort showed that hypothermia is a highly effective treatment when applied to newborn infants following birth asphyxia. Meta-analysis of a number of large randomised controlled trials showed that hypothermia for 72 hours started within 6 hours of birth significantly increased the chance of survival without brain damage.

== Research ==
TTM has been studied in several use scenarios where it has not usually been found to be helpful, or is still under investigation, despite theoretical grounds for its usefulness.

=== Stroke ===
There is currently no evidence supporting targeted temperature management use in humans for stroke and clinical trials have not been completed. Most of the data concerning hypothermia's effectiveness in treating stroke is limited to animal studies. These studies have focused primarily on ischemic stroke as opposed to hemorrhagic stroke, as hypothermia is associated with a lower clotting threshold. In these animal studies, hypothermia was represented an effective neuroprotectant. The use of hypothermia to control intracranial pressure (ICP) after an ischemic stroke was found to be both safe and practical.

=== Traumatic brain or spinal cord injury ===
Animal studies have shown the benefit of targeted temperature management in traumatic central nervous system (CNS) injuries. Clinical trials have shown mixed results with regards to the optimal temperature and delay of cooling. Achieving therapeutic temperatures of 33 °C (91 °F) is thought to prevent secondary neurological injuries after severe CNS trauma. A systematic review of randomised controlled trials in traumatic brain injury (TBI) suggests there is no evidence that hypothermia is beneficial.

=== Cardiac arrest ===
A clinical trial in cardiac arrest patients showed that hypothermia improved neurological outcome and reduced mortality. A retrospective study of the use of hypothermia for cardiac arrest patients showed favorable neurological outcome and survival. Osborn waves on electrocardiogram (ECG) are frequent during TTM after cardiac arrest, particularly in patients treated with 33 °C. Osborn waves are not associated with increased risk of ventricular arrhythmia, and may be considered a benign physiological phenomenon, associated with lower mortality in univariable analyses.

=== Neurosurgery ===
As of 2015 hypothermia had shown no improvements in neurological outcomes or in mortality in neurosurgery.

=== Naegleriasis ===
TTM has been used in some cases of naegleriasis.

== See also ==
- Deep hypothermic circulatory arrest

== Sources ==
This article incorporates text from a free content work. Licensed under CC BY 4.0. Text taken from Anatomy and Physiology, J. Gordon Betts et al, Openstax.
