= Anthony David Edwards =

British doctor and medical researcher

Anthony David Edwards MBE (born 26 November 1954) is a British Paediatrician and Neuroscientist. He is Professor of Paediatrics and Neonatal Medicine, and the Director of the Centre for the Developing Brain, at King's College London and Consultant Neonatologist at Guy's and St Thomas' NHS Foundation Trust.

His work has focused on the care of the sick newborn infant and human brain development around the time of birth. He has been awarded a Membership of the Order of the British Empire, the James Spence Medal by the Royal College of Paediatrics and Child Health and the Arvo Ylppo Prize by the Finnish Academy for his work on treatments for infants who suffer brain damage, notably therapeutic hypothermia, and the development of magnetic resonance imaging (MRI) for the newborn. In 2024 Edwards was invited to give oral evidence to the House of Lords Committee on Preterm Birth

== Education ==
Edwards attended the King's School Worcester, St Peter's College Oxford, Harvard University and Guy's Hospital Medical School. In 2010 he received the first Doctor of Science Degree to be awarded in the Faculty of Medicine, Imperial College London.

== Career ==
Edwards was Weston Professor of Neonatal Medicine at Imperial College London, and Consultant Neonatologist at the Hammersmith and Queen Charlotte's Hospitals 1993-2012. He was a Group Head in the Medical Research Council Clinical Sciences Centre at Hammersmith 1999-2011. From 2006 to 2012 was Associate Director of the National Institute for Health Research Medicines for Children Research Network. Since 2012 he has been Professor of Paediatrics and Neonatal Medicine, and the Director of the Centre for the Developing Brain, at King's College London and Consultant Neonatologist at Guy's and St Thomas' NHS Foundation Trust. He is a Trustee of Action Medical Research and the Galen and Hilary Weston Foundation.

== Research ==
=== Birth asphyxia and therapeutic hypothermia ===
Edwards was one of the group of scientists that discovered that a modest reduction in brain temperature prevents the development of brain damage if applied after oxygen starvation during birth; it remains the only effective treatment for infants suffering birth asphyxia. He participated: in the laboratory experiments which demonstrated the effect; in work elucidating the mechanisms involved; in human pilot studies and in the definitive trials; in meta-analysis of the trial data; post-implementation monitoring; and in long-term follow up of the effect of treatment. The National Institute for Clinical Excellence mandated therapeutic hypothermia in the United Kingdom in 2011 and Edwards helped write the British Association of Perinatal Medicine Guidelines for the implementation of the therapy in the United Kingdom.

=== Magnetic Resonance Imaging and Premature Birth ===
Edwards and his colleagues worked to extend the use of MRI to understand the problems suffered by infants born extremely preterm. They installed the world-first dedicated neonatal MRI scanner in the Hammersmith Hospital in 1994 with full intensive care capabilities, able to image the smallest and sickest infants needing intensive care. This approach has improved understanding of the issues of preterm birth and provides a tool for testing new therapies to improve outcomes for affected infants.

=== Connectomics ===
Connectomics is the novel scientific field which aims to map all the connections in the brain at micro, meso or macro scale. Macroscale connectomics which investigates links of the scale of millimetres predominantly uses MRI. Edwards led the Developing Human Connectome Project, a major programme funded by the European Research Council which mapped the development of connectivity in the fetal and newborn human brain using structural and functional MRI. Early results from this project can be seen in the BBC Horizon programme "10 things you need to know about the future". The brain images from the project were made freely available to researchers, together with collateral demographic, clinical, neurodevelopmental, genetic and epigenetic information through the National Institute for Mental Health data repository portal. The data form part of the first map of human brain development across the lifespan, and are being used by scientists across the world to understand human brain development and connectivity

== Awards and honours ==
- 2005 Honorary Member, British Association of Perinatal Medicine
- 2002 Fellow of Academy of Medical Sciences
- 2007 Arvo Ylppo Quinquennial Gold Medal and Prize (Finland)
- 2008 National Institute for Health Research Senior Investigator
- 2023 James Spence Medal, Royal College of Paediatrics and Child Health
- 2023 Honorary Member, Neonatal Society
- 2024 Member of the Order of the British Empire

== Publications ==
Edwards had edited one book "Neonatal Neural Rescue" and published over 250 scientific papers
