= Remote ischemic conditioning =

Experimental medical procedure

Remote ischemic conditioning (RIC) is an experimental medical procedure that aims to reduce the severity of ischaemic injury to an organ such as the heart or the brain, most commonly in the situation of a heart attack or a stroke, or during procedures such as heart surgery when the heart may temporary suffer ischaemia during the operation, by triggering the body's natural protection against tissue injury. Although noted to have some benefits in experimental models in animals, this is still an experimental procedure in humans and initial evidence from small studies have not been replicated in larger clinical trials. Successive clinical trials have failed to identify evidence supporting a protective role in humans as of 2015. Two large studies completed in 2023 had re-ignited interest in this technique with positive results.

The procedure involves repeated, temporary cessation of blood flow to a limb to create ischemia (lack of oxygen and glucose) in the tissue. This "conditioning" activates the body's natural protective physiology against reperfusion injury and the tissue damage caused by low oxygen levels—a protection present in many mammals. RIC essentially mimics the cardio-protective effects of exercise; in fact, exercise can be considered a form of RIC in which the stimulus is distant from the organ being protected. RIC has been termed "exercise in a device", especially suited for patients who are unable or unwilling to work out.

== History ==
The phenomenon of ischemic preconditioning (IPC) was discovered in 1986 by C. E. Murry and colleagues, who observed that repeated, temporary cross-clamping of the left anterior descending artery (LAD) in dogs protected the LAD territory of the heart against a subsequent prolonged ischemic event, reducing infarct size by 75%. This was thought to be a local effect and was termed local ischemic preconditioning. The phenomenon was confirmed by other researchers in dogs, pigs, mice, and rats.

In 1993, Karin Przyklenk and colleagues began using the term "remote" when they observed that cross-clamping on the right side of the heart (right circumflex artery) protected the left side of the heart (LAD territory) from ischemia: that is, the protective trigger was remote from the observed effect. Other researchers confirmed this remote effect and found that performing the preconditioning protocol on kidney or gastrointestinal tissue also provided protection to the heart.

In 2002, Raj Kharbanda and Andrew Redington, working at the Hospital for Sick Children in Toronto, showed that non-invasively stopping and starting blood flow in the arm provided the same protection as invasive preconditioning of the heart. This adaptation of the RIC protocol significantly improved its safety and applicability, and resulted in a surge of clinical interest in the technique.

== Clinical trials ==
More than 10,000 patients worldwide have completed clinical trials involving RIC, and another 20,000 are enrolled in ongoing trials. The first human clinical trial of RIC was conducted by Dr. Redington in pediatric patients undergoing heart surgery at the Hospital for Sick Children. The patients treated with RIC prior to surgery exhibited less heart damage, as measured by the biomarker troponin, as well as less need for supportive drugs. This trial was followed by others measuring the effects of RIC on rates and outcomes of heart attacks, heart failure, stroke, and cardiothoracic intervention.

=== Heart attacks ===
In multiple randomized controlled trials, remote ischemic conditioning reduced infarct size in ST-elevation myocardial infarction (STEMI) patients when used in the ambulance or emergency department as an adjunct therapy to primary percutaneous coronary intervention (PCI), or when used with thrombolytic drugs. In seven trials comprising 2,372 STEMI patients, infarct size—a measure of damage to the heart—was reduced by 17–30% on average, and the reduction was greatest (~60%) in the largest infarcts. Further analysis of a Danish study (CONDI-1), in which patients were treated in the ambulance, showed that those who received RIC did not show a decline in myocardial salvage index (a measure of a healthy heart) when they experienced a delay in treatment, while the control group experienced a significant decline in salvage index. The RIC treatment therefore resulted, effectively, in an extension of the "golden hour", the period in which medical treatment for heart attacks is most effective.

Infarct size is a predictor of future cardiovascular events as well as mortality, and researchers doing long-term follow-up on STEMI patients treated with RIC found that the reduction in heart damage at the time of the heart attack resulted in clinical improvement four years later: MACCE (major adverse cardiovascular and cerebrovascular event) rates were reduced by 47% (13.5% vs. 25.6%, p=0.018). This improvement resulted in mean cumulative cardiovascular medical care costs that were €2,763 lower in the RIC-treated group than in the control group (€12,065 vs. €14,828)—savings of approximately 20%.

There are currently two large randomized controlled trials of RIC treatment in STEMI patients ongoing in Europe, both of which will examine the effects of RIC treatment on coronary death and hospitalization for heart failure after one year.

==== Percutaneous coronary intervention ====
Remote ischemic conditioning significantly reduced heart damage (as measured by troponin elevations) in four randomized controlled trials involving 816 elective (non-emergency) PCI patients. The myocardial damage and troponin elevations seen in elective PCI patients are less than that in emergency STEMI patient, because there is less acute reperfusion injury in elective PCI, and damage instead results from distal embolization and side-branch occlusion. Nevertheless, myocardial damage during elective PCI remains a significant predictor of morbidity and mortality, as patients exhibiting any increase in troponin are at a significantly increased risk of future cardiovascular events.

Researchers at Papworth Hospital in Cambridge conducted the first large study of RIC in elective PCI patients (the CRISP study) and found that patients treated with RIC prior to stenting showed a 62% reduction in troponin levels, less chest discomfort, and reduced six-month hospitalization rates. Long-term follow-up of the CRISP study showed that this single RIC treatment resulted in a 35% reduction in six-year MACCE rates.

=== Cardiac and oncological imaging ===
RIC has been shown to reduce Contrast-induced nephropathy (CIN) and contrast-induced acute kidney injury (CI-AKI), two serious complications that can occur when patients are given contrast media during imaging or invasive procedures such as angioplasty or percutaneous aortic valve replacement. The incidence of CIN is 13% in an unselected population and can be as much as 57% in patients with poor kidney function and congestive heart failure. The development of CIN after percutaneous coronary intervention is independently associated with an increased risk of short- and long-term ischemic and hemorrhagic events.

RIC provided a statistically significant benefit in five randomized clinical trials comprising 480 patients. The first report was in an observational study of patients in the United States, and the first randomized clinical trial to show a benefit in patients at extremely high risk of injury (those with Stage 3 or 4 kidney disease, diabetes, or heart failure) was done in Germany. The German study showed a reduced incidence of CIN (a 70% reduction, from 40% to 12%, p=0.002), with no patients in the treated arm needing in-hospital dialysis (compared with 14% in the control group), and reduced six-week readmission rates (a 60% reduction, from 36% to 14%). Similar protection was seen in cancer patients undergoing contrast-enhanced computed tomography (CECT): Researchers found a 35% reduction in CIN across the population, and the patients at highest risk benefited the most, with a 60% reduction.

These results, confirmed in subsequent clinical trials involving cardiac patients, show that RIC can protect the kidneys as well as the heart.

=== Coronary surgery ===
Yetgin and colleagues conducted a systematic review and analysis of RIC in cardiac surgery, examining thirteen trials involving 891 patients, and found that RIC treatment reduced troponin levels by 21% to 49%. In addition, they concluded that trials in which the primary measure was a validated biomarker (e.g., 72-hour cardiac troponin AUC) showed a benefit from RIC treatment, while trials in which a non-validated biomarker (e.g., 24-hour troponin AUC) was the primary measure did not show a benefit.

In the first prospectively designed trial to examine the effect of RIC on clinical outcomes in coronary artery bypass grafting (CABG), Thielmann and colleagues showed that RIC treatment reduced troponin levels and improved long-term morbidity and mortality. However, while patients who received the anesthetic isoflurane benefited from the treatment, the anesthetic propofol blocked the effects of RIC. Investigations in Dr. Gerd Heusch's lab showed that propofol abolishes the phosphorylation of STAT5, a key survival molecule that is activated by RIC. Two other trials in CABG surgery (ERICCA and RIP-HEART) reported neutral results for the clinical benefit of RIC, but both of these trials used propofol as the initiating anesthetic. In a viewpoint letter that followed the publication of the ERICCA and RIP-HEART trials, Heusch and Dr. Bernard Gersh wrote that the use of propofol rather than volatile anesthesia appeared to be a common denominator in all studies that failed to find protection with RIC.

A 2015 trial in high-risk CABG patients showed a reduced incidence of surgical acute kidney injury in RIC-treated patients (37.5% vs. 52.5%, p=0.02), a reduced need for dialysis, and shorter stays in the intensive care unit. This study did not use propofol, and a three-month follow-up found that RIC treatment improved clinical outcomes.

== Emerging applications ==
Researchers are working to expand the clinical applications of RIC beyond cardiovascular indications. Because RIC modifies the expression of genes involved in inflammation, coagulation, and complement pathways, researchers believe repeated treatments (chronic conditioning) could aid recovery or prevent disease progression in a variety of chronic conditions. The areas of research that are most advanced are in heart failure and stroke recovery.

=== Heart failure ===
Despite advances in the treatment of heart attacks, survivors are at a significant risk of heart failure and death within five years because of adverse remodeling processes in the heart. The acute inflammatory process that occurs soon after a heart attack is necessary for healing and scar formation, but can be harmful if it continues for an extended period of time. Continued oxidative stress results in inflammation, death of heart cells, fibrosis of the ventricles, and hypertrophy (enlargement) of the heart, progressing to heart failure. Studies show that repeated daily RIC treatments lead to significant downregulation of neutrophil activation and proinflammatory responses in humans, and could reduce post-heart-attack inflammation.

In rodent models of post-heart-attack heart failure, daily RIC treatment for 28 days resulted in reduced markers of inflammation (including TGF-b), improved ventricular function, and improved survival over 100 days, in a dose-dependent manner. This study provided the scientific rationale for the CRIC-RCT clinical trial (NCT01817114). There are two other ongoing randomized controlled trials of chronic conditioning in heart-failure patients: NCT01664611 and NCT02248441.

=== Neurological indications ===
In addition to its efficacy in cardiological settings, RIC is thought to remotely recruit neuroprotective pathways, and its safety, feasibility, and low cost give it high potential in a wide variety of neurological conditions. Like the heart, the brain has self-protective abilities and can adapt to stress and injury (e.g., hypoxia or ischemia) by activating cellular protective pathways. RIC not only confers protection against ischemia-reperfusion injury, but also increases cerebral blood flow, which may contribute to the neuroprotective effect.

==== Stroke ====
The first randomized trial of RIC in acute stroke patients was done by Hougaard and colleagues in Denmark. Compared with standard treatment, RIC increased tissue survival after one month and reduced the risk of infarction in high-risk tissue.

Two randomized trials of RIC have also been conducted in patients with intracranial atherosclerotic stenosis (ICAS), a significant risk factor for stroke with a high risk of recurrence. The first—which included 68 Chinese patients under the age of 80 who had intracranial arterial stenosis of 50–99% and had experienced a stroke or transient ischemic attack (TIA) within the previous 30 days—evaluated the effects of 300 days of brief, repetitive, bilateral arm ischemic conditioning on stroke recurrence. It found that the conditioning reduced the incidence of recurrent stroke from 23.3% to 5% at 90 days, and from 26.7% to 7.9% at 300 days; it also improved the rate of recovery (measured with the modified Rankin scale) and cerebral perfusion. The second trial examined the effect of 180 days of RIC on symptomatic ICAS in Chinese people aged 80–95 years, as invasive stenting is not always suitable for elderly patients, and less-invasive methods are needed. RIC safely prevented stroke and TIA recurrence and reduced inflammation in these patients.

==== Cerebral infarction ====
Delayed cerebral infarction after subarachnoid hemorrhage is a major cause of morbidity. Two Phase I clinical trials have shown that RIC after subarachnoid hemorrhage is feasible, safe, and well tolerated, and can prevent delayed neurological deficits.

==== Traumatic brain injury ====
Traumatic brain injury (TBI) shares many pathophysiological pathways with acute stroke, and ischemic preconditioning increases the brain's resistance to injury. Animal models of stroke (both open-skull and closed-skull models) show that RIC improves cerebral blood flow; reduces ischemic injury, edema, and cell death; and improves functional outcomes. A small randomized clinical trial in severe TBI also showed that patients who received RIC had lower levels of brain injury biomarkers.

==== Vascular cognitive impairment ====
Reduced cerebral blood flow is an early finding in vascular cognitive impairment (VCI). Cardiovascular risk factor control is currently the only management option for VCI, but observational studies suggest that exercise slows down cognitive decline. In a mouse model that reproduced the damage seen in patients with VCI (white matter damage, cerebral hypoperfusion, inflammation, blood–brain barrier damage, and cognitive deficits), daily RIC for two weeks increased cerebral blood flow, and this increase persisted for one week after cessation of conditioning. Moreover, mice that underwent RIC had less inflammation, less white and gray matter damage, less β‑amyloid deposition, and improved cognition.

=== Oxidative stress mitigation in laparoscopic surgery ===
In laparoscopic procedures, CO_{2} pneumoperitoneum is essential for adequate visualization but can lead to elevated intra-abdominal pressure, potentially causing splanchnic hypoperfusion and capillary microcirculation impairment. This scenario predisposes to ischemia-reperfusion injury, characterized by an upsurge in reactive oxygen species (ROS), culminating in a spectrum of peritoneal pathologies, including mesothelial cell damage, inflammatory cascades, and adhesion formation.

Ischemic preconditioning (IPC), entailing transient ischemic episodes prior to prolonged ischemia, has emerged as a prophylactic strategy to ameliorate such iatrogenic oxidative insults. In vitro and in vivo studies elucidate that IPC augments cellular anti-oxidative defenses and modulates inflammatory mediators, potentially attenuating peritoneal injury sequelae. Despite the theoretical mechanistic plausibility and encouraging preclinical data, the translatability of these findings to human laparoscopy remains tentative. Human trials in laparoscopic contexts have shown IPC's potential in modulating biomarkers associated with oxidative stress and alleviating clinical symptoms. Notably, a study involving remote ischemic conditioning applied to the upper arm exhibited enhanced skin microcirculation in the lower extremities, suggesting systemic microcirculatory benefits. Furthermore, in a trial involving patients undergoing laparoscopic surgery, those subjected to IPC demonstrated notable improvements in systemic antioxidant capacity, as evidenced by elevated glutathione levels. Additionally, these patients reported a significant reduction in pain intensity, highlighting IPC's potential in enhancing patient comfort and recovery. These findings, while preliminary, underscore IPC's promise in laparoscopic surgery, suggesting its role in reducing oxidative stress and improving postoperative outcomes.

== Timing and protocol ==
The RIC stimulus can be applied to different tissues in the body. Either the upper limb (arm) or the lower limb (leg) may be used; however, because it is easier and more comfortable, most clinical trials use the upper limb. Researchers investigating the optimal dosing for the RIC stimulus have concluded that the upper limb is superior to the lower limb, that RIC on one limb generates an equivalent response to RIC on two limbs, and that maximal benefit occurs at 4–6 cycles.

=== Timing ===
The non-invasiveness and ease of application of RIC have allowed it to be studied in more situations than the original, invasive ischemic preconditioning, which was only realistically applicable in elective surgery. Studies have examined the effects of RIC applied at different times:

- Pre-conditioning: RIC is applied within the hour prior to an intervention (e.g., elective cardiothoracic and surgical procedures)
- Per-conditioning: RIC is applied at the time of the ischemic event (e.g., evolving heart attack, acute stroke, or trauma)
- Chronic conditioning: RIC is applied daily for a period of time after an ischemic event (e.g., after a heart attack or stroke, or in chronic conditions such as peripheral vascular disease or ulcerative colitis)

The term "post-conditioning" is used to describe short, intermittent inflations of an intra-coronary balloon at the time of reperfusion, and does not refer to RIC on a limb. Delayed post-conditioning is synonymous with chronic conditioning.

=== Manual vs. automated conditioning ===
Remote ischemic conditioning on the limb is mostly done by healthcare professionals, using a manual blood-pressure cuff and a stopwatch. The standard RIC protocol, used in the majority of clinical trials, consists of four cycles of five minutes of inflation at 200mmHg, followed by five minutes of deflation. This is the original conditioning protocol described by Murry et al. based on examinations of energetic depletion of the cell.

=== Automated conditioning ===
One automated device is approved in Europe and Canada for the delivery of remote ischemic conditioning: the autoRIC Device, which delivers four cycles of five minutes of inflation at 200mm Hg followed by five minutes of deflation to the upper limb. In a comparative study of this device and manual conditioning, the autoRIC Device was shown to be much easier to use.
