= S-1 Gard =

Safety device

The S-1 Gard (also known as the Dangerzone Deflector and the People Catcher) is a safety device consisting of a curved polyurethane guard, mounted in front of the right rear wheels of transit buses, designed to deflect a person out of the path of the wheels in order to prevent injury or death. It is distributed by Public Transportation Safety International (PTS) and is currently installed on bus fleets in major cities such as Los Angeles, Washington, D.C., Chicago, Austin (TX) and Baltimore, among others. The S-1 Gard was invented by Mark B. Barron of PTS in 1994.

Where no S-1 Gard is present, the prevalent type of accident involving transit vehicles and individuals is pedestrians or cyclists falling in the path of and/or being pulled under the wheel, as opposed to individuals being struck by the vehicle body. Among bus wheel accidents, approximately 85% occur at the right hand drive wheel (curbside rear wheel). The accidents most often occur as buses are making right-hand turns, when pedestrians who are not fully on the sidewalk or who fall into the street risk being run over by the right rear wheels of the bus. It is estimated that 40–100 people are seriously injured this way annually in the United States, although precise statistics concerning this are lacking. In 2001 in Chicago, a total of nine pedestrians were injured in incidents involving the rear right wheels of Chicago Transit Authority buses, prior to the CTA's retrofitting of its bus fleet with the S-1 Gard.

Because of Bernoulli's principle, a decrease in air pressure between a larger object (such as a transit bus or large truck) and a smaller object (such as a pedestrian or cyclist) is created when passing in close proximity, resulting in a force that pulls the smaller object towards the larger object. The greater the velocity of the larger object, and the greater the difference in mass of the two objects, the greater the force. This principle accounts for accidents wherein, for instance, a cyclist being closely passed by a moving bus is pulled toward the bus, loses control and is thrown under the path of the wheels. The curvature of the guard is designed to counteract Bernoulli's principle by producing a net outward pressure away from the direction of travel of the bus, in addition to physically pushing an object out of the way.

It is manufactured in two pieces, totaling approximately two feet wide by one foot high, and is curved (convex). It is mounted onto the chassis of the bus in front of the rear right wheels and behind the rear door, if present. Because of its curved design, the force vector is outward and to the right, helping move a fallen body out from under the bus.

The S-1 Gard is noted by the Transportation Research Board as a strategy designed to reduce the severity but not the likelihood of injuries resulting from accidents involving pedestrians and bicyclists coming in contact with the rear right wheels of transit buses only. TCRP Report No. 125 notes that further research is needed to determine its effectiveness. It has been credited by public transit officials with significantly reducing, if not eliminating, injuries and fatalities involving the rear right wheels of transit buses.

== MDZ Shield ==
In 2010, PTS announced the MDZ Shield as an alternative to the S-1 Gard for school buses.
