= Hypothermia therapy for neonatal encephalopathy =

Medical treatment for newborns

- Specialty: Neonatologist(pediatrician)

Mild total body hypothermia, induced by cooling a baby to 33-34°C for three days after birth, is nowadays a standardized treatment after moderate to severe hypoxic ischemic encephalopathy in full-term and near to fullterm neonates. It has recently been proven to be the only medical intervention which reduces brain damage, and improves an infant's chance of survival and reduced disability.

Hypoxic ischemic encephalopathy has many causes and is defined essentially as the reduction in the supply of blood or oxygen to a baby's brain before, during, or even after birth. It is a major cause of death and disability, occurring in approximately 2–3 per 1000 births and causing around 20% of all cases of cerebral palsy. A 2013 Cochrane review found that therapeutic hypothermia is useful in full term babies with encephalopathy.

== Medical uses ==
=== Extended follow-up of trial participants ===
Studies have been undertaken to determine the effects of hypothermia beyond early childhood. Participants in the CoolCap, NICHD and TOBY trials were entered into extended follow-up programmes. None of these programmes have sufficient power to make confident assessments of the long-term effect of hypothermia, however even these underpowered studies give important information on whether the therapeutic effects of cooling are sustained beyond the first two years after birth.

The most significant follow-up study published so far is the assessment of the NICHD trial participants at 6–7 years. Of the 208 trial participants, primary outcome data were available for 190. Of the 97 children in the hypothermia group and the 93 children in the control group, death or an IQ score below 70 occurred in 46 (47%) and 58 (62%), respectively (P=0.06); death occurred in 27 (28%) and 41 (44%) (P=0.04); and death or severe disability occurred in 38 (41%) and 53 (60%) (P=0.03). The CoolCap study gathered data using the WeeFim questionnaire at 7–8 years of age, but only collected information on 62 (32 cooled; 30 standard care) of 135 surviving children who had had neurodevelopmental assessment at 18 months. Disability status at 18 months was strongly associated with WeeFIM ratings (P < 0.001) suggesting that the therapeutic effect persisted, but there was no significant effect of treatment (P = 0.83).

These results were not quite conclusive, as the effect in the NICHD trial appears to be on mortality rather than neurological function, but they gave considerable confidence that the therapeutic effects of hypothermia following birth asphyxia are sustained into later childhood, and when the Toby trial childhood follow up was published in the New England Journal of Medicine it confirmed the persistence of the effect

=== Current state of the evidence ===
Hypothermic neural rescue therapy is an evidence-based clinical treatment which increases a severely injured full term infant's chance of surviving without brain damage detectable at 18 months by about 50%, an effect which seems to be sustained into later childhood.

At present data relate only to full term infants, and all human studies of hypothermia treatment have so far been restricted to infants >36 weeks out of an expected 40 weeks gestation. There are both more potential side effects on the developing premature with lung disease, and there is more evident protection by hypothermia when a greater volume of complex brain is actively developing. During mid gestation to late term the fetal brain is undergoing increasingly complex progressive growth of first the mid-brain and then development of the cortex and "higher" centers. The effects of fetal asphyxia on the developing brain in sheep are dependent on gestational age with near term fetuses showing both less tolerance of asphyxia and maximal damage in the rapidly expanding cortex; while fetuses prior to the last third of development experience more extended tolerance of asphyxia with maximal effects on the growing mid-brain. The fetal sheep asphyxia model also suggests a six-hour window post asphyxia in which hypothermia will have greatest benefit.

Since the prerequisites regarding immediate closeness after giving birth radically chances, researchers have become curious regarding parent's experiences and how to improve the nursing care around effects families. In interviews made by different researchers in different countries it has been clear the parents want clear communication with the NICU staff, but also in between the NICU staff and the obstetrics staff. They also described a strong wish touching and being really close to their baby but also actively participate in the baby's care

There remains much that is unknown. Recognition of infants with marginal external signs of asphyctic damage at birth, who still develop moderate hypoxic ischemic encephalopathy would be enhanced by finding more reliable bio-markers or physiologic tests accurately predicting the risk for progressive damage. These tests could also prevent unwarranted, expensive treatment of many infants. Long-term follow-up has yet to demonstrate show persisting benefit, but available data together with an imaging study nested in TOBY also found reduced brain tissue damage in cooled infants are encouraging.

The simplicity that attracted empiricists to cooling centuries ago now makes hypothermic neural rescue with accurate patient selection a potentially transforming therapy for low-resource environments where birth asphyxia remains a major cause of death and disability. Ironically this brings back the problem of cooling infants in an environment where modern resuscitation and intensive care are not available.

== Mechanisms of action ==
Much of what is known about the mechanisms of hypothermic neuroprotection is gathered from studies in mature and adult models. What follows uses some of these data while trying to focus on the immature brain.

=== Hypoxia-ischaemia ===
Cerebral hypoxia-ischaemia results in reduced cerebral oxidative metabolism, cerebral lactic acidosis and cell membrane ionic transport failure; if prolonged there is necrotic cell death. Although rapid recovery of cerebral energy metabolism occurs following successful resuscitation this is followed some hours later by a secondary fall in cerebral high energy phosphates accompanied by a rise in intracellular pH, and the characteristic cerebral biochemical disturbance at this stage is a lactic alkalosis. In neonates, the severity of this secondary impairment in cerebral metabolism are associated with abnormal subsequent neurodevelopmental outcome and reduced head growth.

Several adverse biological events contribute to this secondary deterioration, including: release of excitatory amino acids which activate N-methyl-D-aspartate (NMDA) and amino-3-hydroxy-5-methyl-4-isoxazolepropionate (AMPA) receptors on neurons (30,37) and oligodendroglial precursors, accumulation of excitatory neurotransmitters, generation of reactive oxygen radicals, intracellular calcium accumulation and mitochondrial dysfunction. Whilst necrotic cell death is prominent in the immediate and acute phases of severe cerebral insults, the predominant mode of death during the delayed phase of injury appears to be apoptosis. Neuroprotective mechanisms need to interact with these mechanisms to have beneficial effect.

Newborn hypoxic-ischaemic brain injury differs from injury in the adult brain in several ways: NMDA receptor toxicity is much higher in the immature brain. Apoptotic mechanisms including activation of caspases, translocation of apoptosis-inducing factor and cytochrome-c release are much greater in the immature than the adult. The inflammatory activation is different with less contribution from polymorphonuclear cells and a more prominent role of IL-18 whereas IL-1, which is critical in the adult brain, is less important. The anti-oxidant system is underdeveloped with reduced capacity to inactivate hydrogen peroxide.

=== Actions of hypothermia ===
Mild hypothermia helps prevent disruptions to cerebral metabolism both during and following cerebral insults. Hypothermia decreases the cerebral metabolic rate for glucose and oxygen and reduces the loss of high energy phosphates during hypoxia-ischaemia and during secondary cerebral energy failure, and reduces delayed cerebral lactic alkalosis. The simultaneous increase in cytotoxic oedema and loss of cerebral cortical activity that accompanies secondary energy failure is also prevented.

Hypothermia appears to have multiple effects at a cellular level following cerebral injury. Hypothermia reduces vasogenic oedema, haemorrhage and neutrophil infiltration after trauma. The release of excitatory neurotransmitters is reduced, limiting intracellular calcium accumulation. Free radical production is lessened, which protects cells and cellular organelles from oxidative damage during reperfusion. In addition mild hypothermia may reduce the activation of the cytokine and coagulation cascades through increased activation of suppressor signalling pathways, and by inhibiting release of platelet activating factor.

Many of the effects induced by mild hypothermia may help to reduce the number of cells undergoing apoptosis. Experimental and clinical studies indicate that the number of apoptotic neurons is reduced caspase activity is lessened and cytochrome c translocation is diminished by mild hypothermia, and there may be an increase in expression of the anti-apoptotic protein BCl-2.

== History ==
Many physicians over the centuries have tried to resuscitate babies after birth by altering their body temperatures, essentially aiming to animate the infant by inducing the onset of breathing. Little thought was given to brain protection, because cerebral hypoxia during birth was not linked with later neurological problems until William John Little in 1861, and even then this was controversial; Sigmund Freud, for example, famously disagreed, and when scientific studies of neonatal therapeutic hypothermia were begun in the 1950s researchers like Bjorn Westin still reported their work in terms of re-animation rather than neuroprotection. Investigators such as James Miller and Clement Smith carried out clinical observations and careful physiological experiments, but although some babies were conscientiously followed up, they were not mainly concerned with long term neurological outcome.

However, by the 1960s physicians saw hypothermia after delivery as something to be avoided. The problem of infants who failed to breathe at birth had been solved by the invention of mechanical ventilation, so any benefit cooling might have for re-animation was no longer needed, and an influential trial showed that keeping small and preterm infants warm increased survival. These results, together with observational and experimental data made it an article of medical faith for decades that babies should not be allowed to get cold.

Consequently, during the next two decades studies of neonatal hypothermia in Europe and the USA were sporadic and often unsuccessful. An interest in cooling for brain protection was beginning to emerge, but contemporary neuroscience provided few useful concepts to guide this research and little progress was made. Although across the Iron Curtain in the Soviet Union cooling was being applied empirically following birth asphyxia, the language barrier, cold war politics and the Russians' failure to carry out randomised controlled trials contributed to an almost total ignorance of this work in the West. Indeed, a group of Russian neonatologists who described hypothermic neural rescue during a visit to the Neonatal Unit in Bristol, UK, met with little interest.

=== Neural rescue ===
In the late 1980s the development of a new set of concepts and problems led to a re-examination. A new generation of neonatal researchers were influenced by the growing evidence that protecting the brain against the effects of oxygen deprivation during labour might be possible. These researchers were aware that cooling produced powerful intra-ischaemic neuroprotection during cardiac surgery but a new concept of hypothermic post-insult neural rescue developed. This shift in thinking was possible because of at least three major new ideas that were developing at the same time: delayed post-ischaemic cell death; excitotoxicity; and apoptosis.

=== Delayed cell death ===
The first paradigm shift that affected neonatal researchers in particular was the idea that if a baby was resuscitated after cerebral hypoxia-ischaemia there was a period of time before brain cells started to die. Osmund Reynolds at University College London used the newly developed technique of Magnetic Resonance Spectroscopy (MRS) to show that the infant brain metabolism is normal in the hours after birth asphyxia and deteriorated only after a distinct delay. Robert Vannucci confirmed the effect with painstaking biochemistry, and delayed injury was also reported in neuropathological studies.

Delayed brain injury (called 'secondary energy failure' by Reynolds) was a critical new idea. If brain cells remained normal for a time and the mechanism of the delayed death could be unravelled, it opened the possibility of therapeutic intervention in what had previously seemed an impossible situation.

=== Excitotoxicity ===
The new and transforming concept of excitotoxicity developed from the seminal experiments of John Olney and Brian Meldrum. They showed that at least some of the neural cell death caused by hypoxia-ischaemia is mediated by excess production of the excitatory neurotransmitter glutamate, and that pharmacological blockade of the N-methyl-D-aspartate receptor could provide good protection against hypoxic damage. Olney and Meldrum had shifted the paradigm, allowing researchers to think of hypoxic-ischaemic damage as a treatable disease.

=== Apoptosis ===
However, it was still a mystery how and why cells triggered by hypoxia-ischaemia should die hours or days later, particularly when it became clear that glutamate levels were not particularly high during secondary energy failure. The next critical idea came with the discovery of programmed cell death, a novel form of cell suicide. Originally observed as a pathological appearance and named apoptosis ("falling off", as of leaves) in the 1970s, Horvitz, Raff and Evan provided a molecular understanding and showed that apoptosis could be triggered by cellular insults. The radical idea that hypoxia-ischaemia triggered a cell suicide programme which could explain the perplexing phenomenon of delayed cell death was soon supported by experimental and human data, and many researchers believe this helps explain why neural rescue works in the newborn. However the picture is complex: both apoptosis and necrosis are present in variable proportions; and there seems to be prolonged neurodegeneration after an insult. Research into this problem continues.

=== Neonatal neural rescue ===
These ideas flowed through the perinatal research community, producing a new belief that neural rescue after birth asphyxia should be possible. Amongst the first to have attempt neonatal neural rescue in animals were Ingmar Kjellmer and Henrik Hagberg in Gothenburg, and Michael Johnston in Baltimore. The potential began to draw in other neonatal researchers from diverse fields to begin neuroprotection research, including those who came to form the informal neonatal hypothermia research group:

Peter Gluckman and Tania Gunn were endocrinologists in the University of Auckland New Zealand and interested in cooling for its effect on thyroid function; they had first cooled a sheep fetus for endocrine studies in 1983. Denis Azzopardi, John Wyatt and David Edwards, then young researchers working for Reynolds, were using Reynolds's sophisticated MRS approach to replicate secondary energy failure in newborn piglets and immature rats; in Gluckman's laboratory Alistair Gunn and Chris Williams developed a simple and elegant biophysical method using cerebral impedance to do essentially the same thing in fetal sheep. Marianne Thoresen, who was working on cerebral perfusion, was prompted to think about neuroprotection by stories of children who fell through the Norwegian ice and suffering prolonged drowning in iced water but emerged with preserved cerebral function.

There were many potential therapies around which might achieve neural rescue, and most of these workers did not immediately move to hypothermia. Magnesium was an appealingly simple excitoxin receptor antagonist that protected cells in culture: the Reynolds group tested it in their piglet model without success. Gluckman and Gunn started by looking unsuccessfully at flunarizine, a calcium entry inhibitor. Edwards picked on nitric oxide synthase inhibition which was also a failure. Gluckman had success with his innovative studies of IGF-1, but could not immediately translate this to clinical practice.

== See also ==
- Birth asphyxia
- Neonatal encephalopathy
- Neonatal intensive care unit
- Neuroprotection
- Neuroregeneration
- Therapeutic hypothermia
