= Sarnat staging =

- Synonyms: Sarnat Classification
- Purpose: classification for hypoxic-ischaemic encephalopathy of newborn

Sarnat staging, Sarnat Classification or the Sarnat Grading Scale is a classification scale for hypoxic-ischaemic encephalopathy of the newborn (HIE), a syndrome caused by a lack of adequate oxygenation around the time of birth which manifests as altered consciousness, altered muscle tone, and seizures. HIE is graded based on the infant's clinical presentation, examination findings, the presence of seizures and the duration of illness. Sarnat staging is used alongside electroencephalogram (EEG) findings to provide information about the prognosis for the infant. Mild HIE, according to the scale, usually has a normal outcome, whereas in severe HIE the mortality rate is 75%, and 80% of survivors have neurological sequelae.

UK Resuscitation Council guidelines on newborn life support recommend that a baby who received significant resuscitation at birth and who goes on to show signs of encephalopathy should be assessed by Sarnat Staging between 24 and 48 hours from birth.

== Staging ==
	Grade I Mild	Grade II Moderate	Grade III Severe
Alertness	Hyperalert	Lethargy	Coma
Muscle tone	Normal or increased	Hypotonic	Flaccid
Seizures	None	Frequent	Uncommon
Pupils	Dilated, reactive	Small, reactive	Variable, fixed
Respiration	Regular	Periodic	Apnoea
Duration	< 24 Hours	2 - 14 Days	Weeks

Adapted from

== See also ==
- Cerebral hypoxia
