= Ischemic preconditioning =

Experimental medical technique

- MeSH: D019194

Ischemic preconditioning (IPC) is a technique for producing resistance to the loss of blood supply, and thus oxygen, to tissues of many types. In the heart, IPC is an intrinsic process whereby repeated short episodes of ischaemia protect the myocardium against a subsequent ischaemic insult and reperfusion injury.

It was first identified in 1986 by Murry et al. This group exposed anesthetised open-chest dogs to four periods of 5 minute coronary artery occlusions followed by a 5-minute period of reperfusion before the onset of a 40-minute sustained occlusion of the coronary artery. The control animals had no such period of "ischaemic preconditioning" and had much larger infarct sizes compared with the dogs that did. The exact molecular pathways behind this phenomenon have yet to be fully understood.

== Phenomenon ==
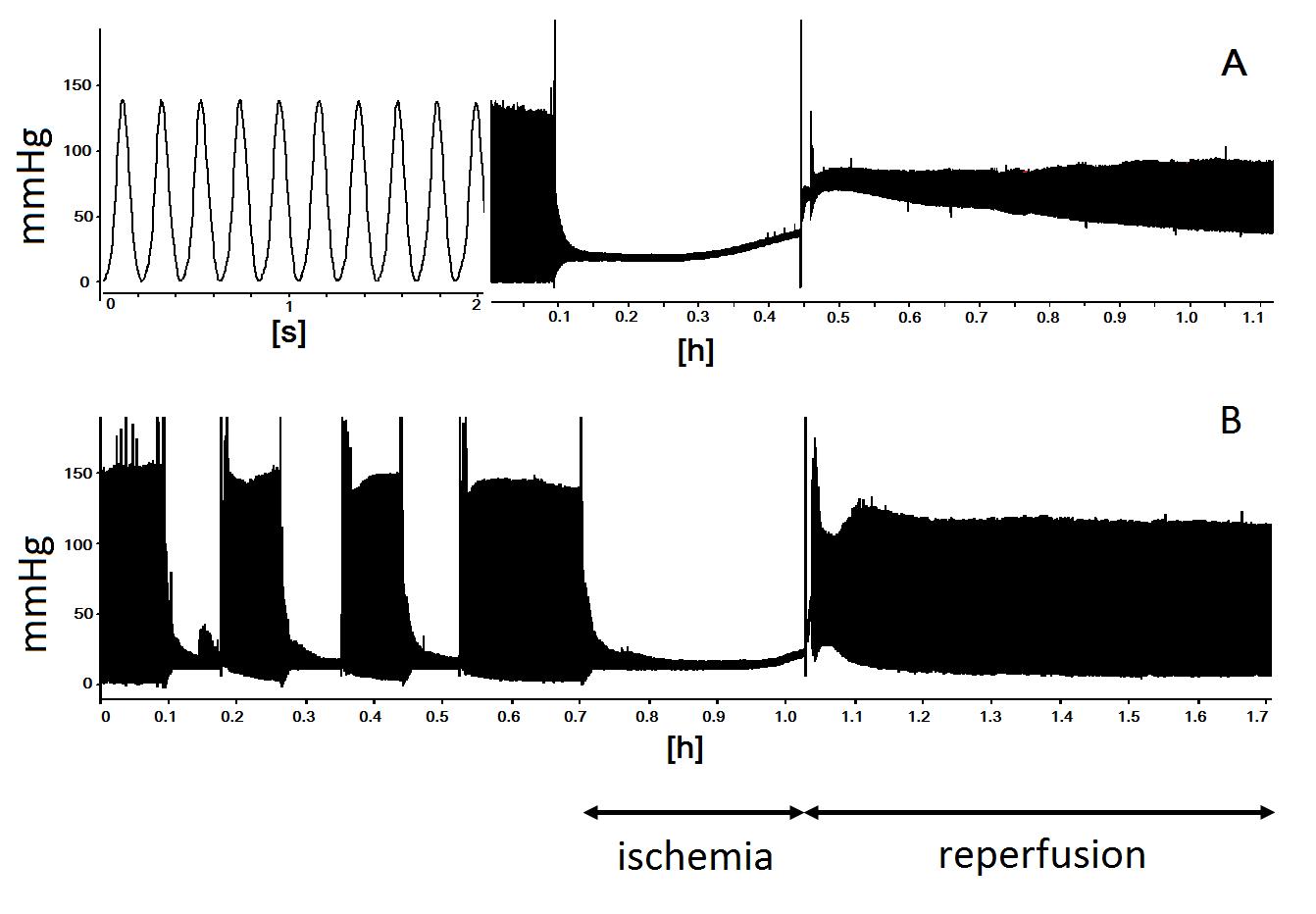
Ischemic preconditioning of the heart (B) provides functional recovery of the heart contractile activity at reperfusion

If the blood supply to an organ or a tissue is impaired for a short time (usually less than five minutes) then restored so that blood flow is resumed, and the process repeated two or more times, the cells downstream of the tissue or organ are robustly protected from a final ischemic insult when the blood supply is cut off entirely and permanently.

The protective effect which is imparted by IPC has two windows of protection. The first lasts between 4–6 hours and has been named classical or early preconditioning. The second window begins at 24 hours and lasts up to 72 hours after the ischaemia and reperfusion stimulus.

In an experimental setting if the left anterior descending coronary artery of the animal is ligated the downstream cardiac cellular mass is infarcted and will be injured and then die. If on the other hand the tissue is subjected to IPC the downstream cellular mass will sustain only minimal to modest damage. IPC protects the tissue by initiating a cascade of biochemical events that allows for an up-regulation of the energetics of the tissue. The locus of this phenomenon is the intracellular organelle, the mitochondrion.

== Mechanisms ==
Investigations of various exogenous circulating ligands such as the delta active opiates and opioids simulate the phenomenon of IPC thus protecting the downstream tissues without the IPC intermittent ligating procedure.

=== Early preconditioning ===
Early preconditioning is thought to be stimulated by local action of adenosine, opiates, and bradykinin, which are all endogenously released by ischemic cells. The presence of each substance is not required but the protection is more potent if they are. They activate G-protein coupled pathways, which carries a protective signal to an end-effector. There have been many suggestions to what this might be, including the sarcolemmal ATP-sensitive potassium channel, the mitochondrial ATP-sensitive potassium channel, the mitochondrial permeability transition pore, reactive oxygen species generation, chloride channels, the inward rectifier potassium ion channel, and connexon 43 related channels.

=== Impairment of preconditioning ===
It has also been shown that the protective effect of IPC is suppressed by pathological conditions such as hypercholesterolemia, hyperglycemia, hypertension, cardiac hypertrophy, and hyperhomocysteinemia.

== Ischemic postconditioning ==
Animal research and one single human case also suggests that ischemic conditioning is also beneficial following a stroke or heart attack.

Using VEGF (a mimic of ischemic conditioning) on rats with chronic cerebral hypoperfusion before bone marrow mononuclear cell transplantation provides results better than simple transplantation. Because VEGF is used after hypoperfusion has happened, this is a case of postconditioning.

== In humans ==
=== Possible presence in methadone users ===
The only group of humans who are chronically exposed to an opioid with delta activity are methadone-maintained patients treated for chronic pain or opioid addiction. These patients have a coronary risk profile greater than the general population:

1. 90% smoke. In the general population in the USA ~25% smoke.
2. Heart Healthy living i.e. attention to lipid control is less frequent than in the general population
3. ~25% of the patients in Methadone Maintenance Programs use cocaine, which is highly ischemogenic, one or more times a year. Less than 1% of the USA's general population is reported to do so.

Preliminary and as yet unpublished surveys of the methadone-treated population point to a high degree of protection from myocardial ischemic events. The one published study, an autopsy series from the Office of Chief Medical Examiner of the City of New York demonstrated significantly less evidence for coronary occlusive disease. Simulation of IPC with methadone could not be evaluated in this post mortem investigation.

=== Clinical research ===
Methods to either mimic or elicit IPC have been attempted in clinical practice in the area of coronary heart disease in an attempt to limit the injury caused to the heart via ischemia and reperfusion injury. Such injury would occur when a patient has an acute myocardial infarct followed by reperfusion by either percutaneous coronary intervention or thrombolysis.

==== Remote ischemic conditioning ====
Rather than blocking a coronary artery, similar results have been seen by blocking the brachial artery using a blood pressure cuff prior to surgery in human patients undergoing coronary artery bypass surgery. This is a case of preconditioning.

Remote ischemic postconditioning appears to work on humans who have had a heart attack.

== See also ==
- Delta opioid receptor
- Remote ischemic conditioning
