= MDZ Shield =

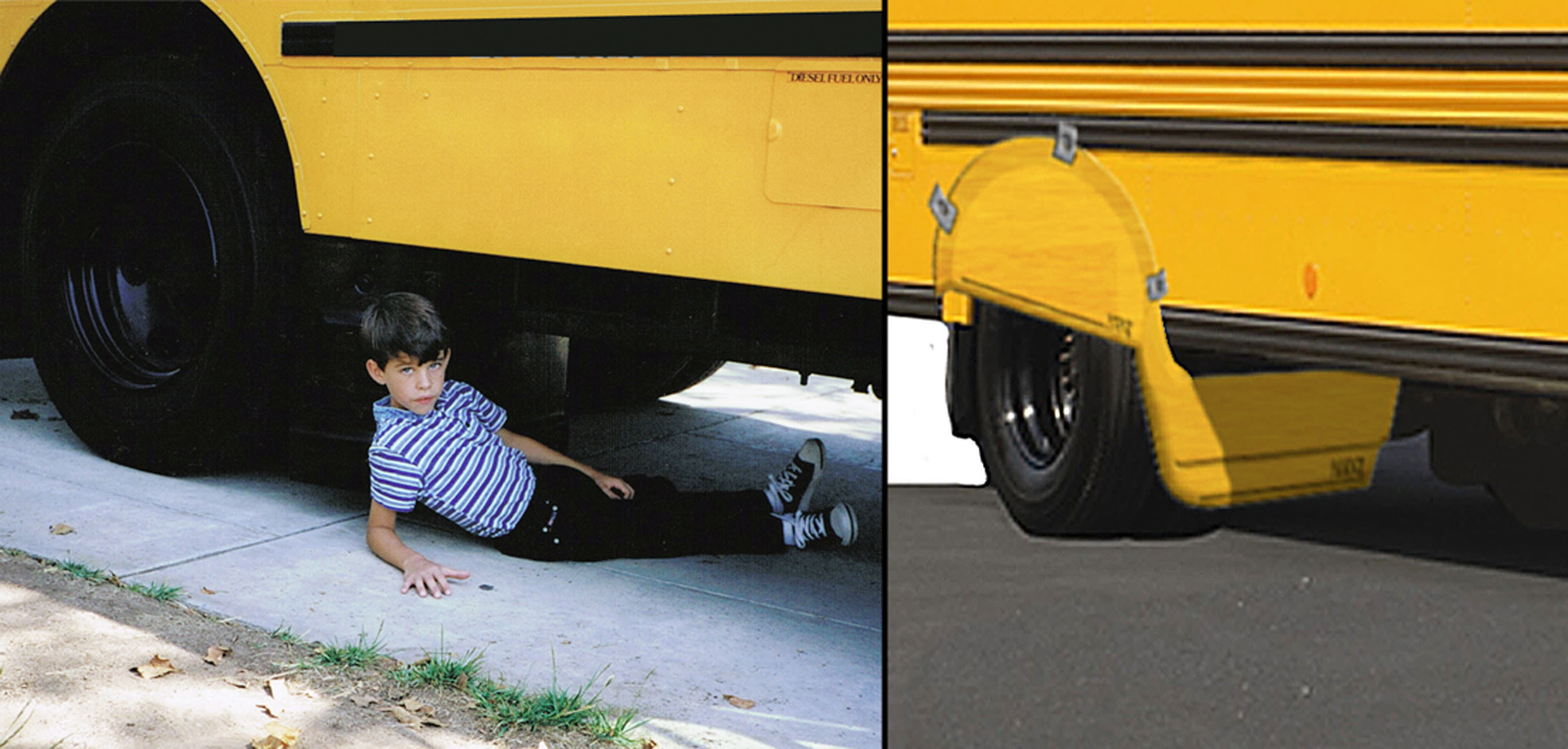
Example of MDZ Shield protecting child

The MDZ Shield (or Minimize Danger Zone Shield) is a safety device for school buses, consisting of a two-piece polyurethane guard that encloses the upper wheel well opening and covers the gap in front of the right rear wheels, designed to deflect a person out of the path of the wheels in order to prevent injury or death. The "danger zone," which the shield acts to mitigate, refers to the area extending 10 feet to the front, rear and sides of the school bus, where children are at most risk of being hit by passing vehicles or by their own bus. Invented and developed by Mark B. Barron of Public Transportation Safety International, developer of the similar S-1 Gard for transit buses, and distributed by The C.E. White Company, the MDZ Shield first came to market in 2011.

== Statistics ==
On average, fatal injuries occur outside the school bus at a rate of four times those occurring inside the bus; besides being struck and killed by other vehicles, the greatest number of child fatalities occur by the right rear tire of the student's own bus. Since the 1970–1971 school year, the Kansas State Department of Education has compiled an annual National School Bus Loading and Unloading Survey, detailing fatalities occurring in the danger zone surrounding school buses on which an MDZ Shield is not present. According to the reports, from the 2004-2005 through 2010-2011 school years, there have been 48 fatalities involving the school bus while loading and unloading. Of those, half were caused by the right rear wheels. Of all fatalities involving the rear wheels, 83% took place on the right side of the bus. The reports have shown that in a majority of cases involving the wheels, children first incur injuries by coming in contact with the tire before being propelled underneath the bus wheels. In addition to the 10 feet surrounding the school bus, there is typically an approximately 2 foot vertical gap in front of the rear wheels between the undercarriage and the ground, in which a child is at increased risk of coming in contact with the tire.

== Design ==
The MDZ Shield is mounted around the right real wheel (or wheels), and consists of two pieces: a wheel shield, which covers the wheel well opening, and a lower tire safety guard, which mounts to a receiver on the undercarriage of the bus and sits approximately four inches from the ground. The shield can deflect a child out of the path of the school bus, thereby minimizing the extent of injury in the danger zone.

== See also ==
- S-1 Gard
