= Reperfusion injury =

Tissue damage after return of blood supply following ischemia or hypoxia

- Other names: Reperfusion insult
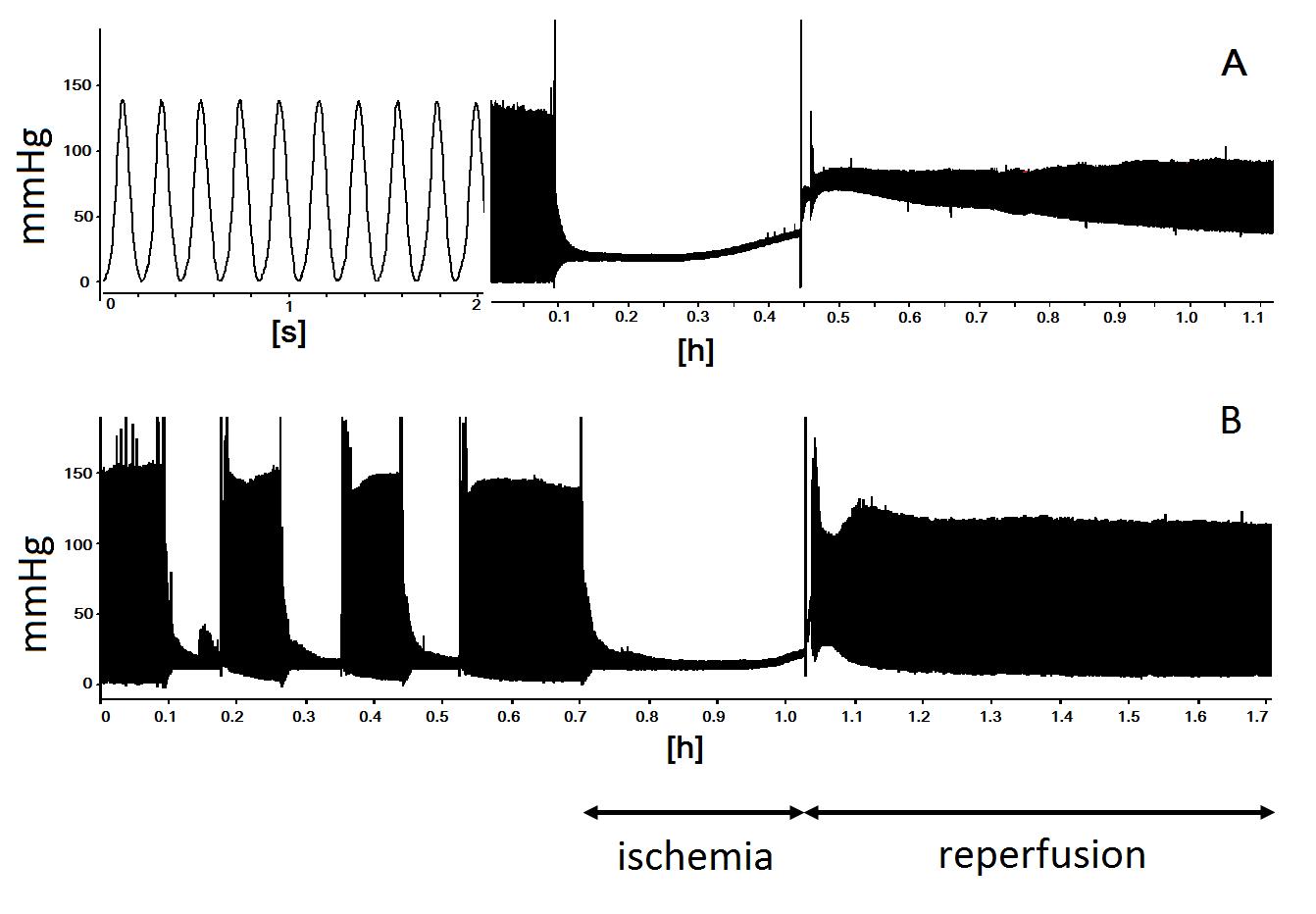
- Native records of contractile activity of the left ventricle of isolated rat heart perfused under Langendorff technique. Curve A – contractile function of the heart is greatly depressed after ischemia-reperfusion. Curve B – a set of short ischemic episodes (ischemic preconditioning) before prolonged ischemia provides functional recovery of contractile activity of the heart at reperfusion.
- Specialty: Cardiology

Reperfusion injury, sometimes called ischemia-reperfusion injury (IRI) or reoxygenation injury, is the tissue damage caused when blood supply returns to tissue (re- + perfusion) after a period of ischemia or lack of oxygen (anoxia or hypoxia). The absence of oxygen and nutrients from blood during the ischemic period creates a condition in which the restoration of circulation results in inflammation and oxidative damage through the induction of oxidative stress rather than (or along with) restoration of normal function.

Reperfusion injury is distinct from cerebral hyperperfusion syndrome (sometimes called "Reperfusion syndrome"), a state of abnormal cerebral vasodilation.

== Causes and importance ==
Reperfusion injury plays a major part in the biochemistry of hypoxic brain injury in stroke. Similar failure processes are involved in brain failure following reversal of cardiac arrest; control of these processes is the subject of ongoing research. Repeated bouts of ischemia and reperfusion injury also are thought to be a factor leading to the formation and failure to heal of chronic wounds such as pressure sores and diabetic foot ulcer. Continuous pressure limits blood supply and causes ischemia, and the inflammation occurs during reperfusion. As this process is repeated, it eventually damages tissue enough to cause a wound.

Reperfusion can cause hyperkalemia.

Reperfusion injury is a primary concern in liver transplantation surgery.

== Mechanisms ==
=== Reverse electron transfer and ROS release ===
The main reason for the acute phase of ischemia-reperfusion injury is oxygen deprivation and, therefore, arrest of generation of ATP (cellular energy currency) by mitochondria oxidative phosphorylation. Tissue damage due to the general energy deficit during ischemia is followed by reperfusion (increase of oxygen level) when the injury is enhanced. Mitochondrial complex I is thought to be the most vulnerable enzyme to tissue ischemia/reperfusion but the mechanism of damage is different in different tissues. For example brain ischemia/reperfusion injury is mediated via complex I redox-dependent inactivation. It was found that lack of oxygen leads to conditions in which mitochondrial complex I loses its natural cofactor, flavin mononucleotide (FMN) and become inactive. When oxygen is present the enzyme catalyzes a physiological reaction of NADH oxidation by ubiquinone, supplying electrons downstream of the respiratory chain (complexes III and IV). Ischemia leads to dramatic increase of succinate level. In the presence of succinate mitochondria catalyze reverse electron transfer so that fraction of electrons from succinate is directed upstream to FMN of complex I.

Reverse electron transfer results in a reduction of complex I FMN, increased generation of reactive oxygen species (ROS), followed by a loss of the reduced cofactor (FMNH_{2}) and impairment of mitochondria energy production. The FMN loss by complex I and I/R injury can be alleviated by the administration of FMN precursor, riboflavin.

=== Inflammation ===
Reperfusion of ischemic tissues is often associated with microvascular injury, particularly due to increased permeability of capillaries and arterioles that lead to an increase of diffusion and fluid filtration across the tissues. Activated endothelial cells produce more ROS but less nitric oxide following reperfusion, and the imbalance results in a subsequent inflammatory response.

The inflammatory response is partially responsible for the damage of reperfusion injury. White blood cells, carried to the area by the newly returning blood, release a host of inflammatory factors such as interleukins as well as free radicals in response to tissue damage. The restored blood flow reintroduces oxygen within cells that damages cellular proteins, DNA, and the plasma membrane. Damage to the cell's membrane may in turn cause the release of more free radicals. Such reactive species may also act indirectly in redox signaling to turn on apoptosis. White blood cells may also bind to the endothelium of small capillaries, obstructing them and leading to more ischemia.

== Treatment ==
=== Therapeutic hypothermia ===
The therapeutic effect of hypothermia is not confined to metabolism and membrane stability. Hypothermia can also prevent the injuries that occur after circulation returns to the brain, or what is termed reperfusion injuries. In fact, an individual suffering from an ischemic insult continues suffering injuries well after circulation is restored. In rats, it has been shown that neurons often die a full 24 hours after blood flow returns. Some theorize that this delayed reaction derives from the various inflammatory immune responses that occur during reperfusion. These inflammatory responses cause intracranial pressure, pressure which leads to cell injury and in some situations cell death. Hypothermia has been shown to help moderate intracranial pressure and therefore to minimize the harmful effect of a patient's inflammatory immune responses during reperfusion. Beyond this, reperfusion also increases free radical production. Hypothermia too has been shown to minimize a patient's production of deadly free radicals during reperfusion. Many now suspect it is because hypothermia reduces both intracranial pressure and free radical production that hypothermia improves patient outcome following a blockage of blood flow to the brain.

=== Remote ischemic conditioning ===
Causing repeated, temporary cessation of blood flow to a limb to create ischemia (lack of oxygen and glucose) in the tissue appears to protect against ischemic and reperfusion injury in animals. Although noted to have some benefits in experimental models in animals, this is still an experimental procedure in humans and initial evidence from small studies have not been replicated in larger clinical trials. Successive clinical trials have failed to identify evidence supporting a protective role in humans as of 2015. Two large human studies completed in 2023 had re-ignited interest in this technique with positive results.

=== Edaravone ===
Edaravone is approved as an adjuvant treatment for stroke in Japan. It appears to improve outcomes when added to reperfusion therapy. It is known to reduce reperfusion injury in animal models and presumably it also helps human patients by reducing reperfusion injury. It can be taken intravenously or by mouth.

Edaravone is combined with dextro-borneol (dexborneol) in edaravone/dexborneol, a drug approved in China for stroke. It is approved in intravenous (2021) and sublingual (2025) forms. The intravenous combination was approved on the basis of trials showing it to be superior to edavarone alone.

=== Hydrogen sulfide treatment ===
There are some preliminary studies in mice that seem to indicate that treatment with hydrogen sulfide (H_{2}S) can have a protective effect against reperfusion injury.

=== Cyclosporin ===
In addition to its well-known immunosuppressive capabilities, the one-time administration of cyclosporin at the time of percutaneous coronary intervention (PCI) has been found to deliver a 40 percent reduction in infarct size in a small group proof of concept study of human patients with reperfusion injury published in The New England Journal of Medicine in 2008.

Cyclosporin has been confirmed in studies to inhibit the actions of cyclophilin D, a protein which is induced by excessive intracellular calcium flow to interact with other pore components and help open the MPT pore. Inhibiting cyclophilin D has been shown to prevent the opening of the MPT pore and protect the mitochondria and cellular energy production from excessive calcium inflows.

However, the studies CIRCUS and CYCLE (published in September 2015 and February 2016 respectively) looked at the use of cyclosporin as a one time IV dose given right before perfusion therapy (PCI). Both studies found there is no statistical difference in outcome with cyclosporin administration.

Reperfusion leads to biochemical imbalances within the cell that lead to cell death and increased infarct size. More specifically, calcium overload and excessive production of reactive oxygen species in the first few minutes after reperfusion set off a cascade of biochemical changes that result in the opening of the so-called mitochondrial permeability transition pore (MPT pore) in the mitochondrial membrane of cardiac cells.

The opening of the MPT pore leads to the inrush of water into the mitochondria, resulting in mitochondrial dysfunction and collapse. Upon collapse, the calcium is then released to overwhelm the next mitochondria in a cascading series of events that cause mitochondrial energy production supporting the cell to be reduced or stopped completely. The cessation of energy production results in cellular death. Protecting mitochondria is a viable cardioprotective strategy.

In 2008, an editorial in the New England Journal of Medicine called for more studies to determine if cyclosporin can become a treatment to ameliorate reperfusion injury by protecting mitochondria. To that end, in 2011 the researchers involved in the original 2008 NEJM study initiated a phase III clinical study of reperfusion injury in 1000 myocardial infarction patients in centers throughout Europe. Results of that study were announced in 2015 and indicated that "intravenous cyclosporine did not result in better clinical outcomes than those with placebo and did not prevent adverse left ventricular remodeling at 1 year." This same process of mitochondrial destruction through the opening of the MPT pore is implicated in making traumatic brain injuries much worse.

=== TRO40303 ===
TRO40303 is a new cardioprotective compound that was shown to inhibit the MPT pore and reduce infarct size after ischemia-reperfusion. It was developed by Trophos company and currently is in Phase I clinical trial.

=== Stem cell therapy ===
Recent investigations suggest a possible beneficial effect of mesenchymal stem cells on heart and kidney reperfusion injury.

=== Superoxide dismutase ===
Superoxide dismutase is an effective anti-oxidant enzyme which converts superoxide anions to water and hydrogen peroxide. Recent researches have shown significant therapeutic effects on pre-clinical models of reperfusion injury after ischemic stroke.

=== Metformin ===
A series of 2009 studies published in the Journal of Cardiovascular Pharmacology suggest that Metformin may prevent cardiac reperfusion injury by inhibition of Mitochondrial Complex I and the opening of MPT pore and in rats.

=== Riboflavin ===
In neonatal in vivo model of brain ischemia/reperfusion, tissue injury can be alleviated by the administration of FMN precursor, riboflavin that prevents inactivation of mitochondrial complex I.

=== Cannabinoids ===
A study published in 2012 show that the synthetic analogue of the phytocannabinoid Tetrahydrocannabivarin (THCV), Δ^{8}-Tetrahydrocannabivarin (Δ^{8}-THCV) and its metabolite 11-OH-Δ^{8}-THCV, prevent hepatic ischaemia/reperfusion injury by decreasing oxidative stress and inflammatory responses through cannabinoid CB2 receptors and thereby decrease tissue injury and inflammation with a protective effect against liver damage. Pretreatment with a CB2 receptor antagonist attenuated the protective effects of Δ^{8}-THCV, while a CB1 antagonist tended to enhance it.

An earlier study published in 2011 found, that Cannabidiol (CBD) also protects against hepatic ischemia/reperfusion injury by attenuating inflammatory signaling and response of oxidative and nitrative stress, and thereby cell death and tissue injury, but independent from classical CB1 and CB2 receptors.

== Reperfusion protection in obligate hibernators ==
Obligatory hibernators such as the ground squirrels show resistance to ischemia/reperfusion (I/R) injury in liver, heart, and small intestine during the hibernation season when there is a switch from carbohydrate metabolism to lipid metabolism for cellular energy supply. This metabolic switch limits anaerobic metabolism and the formation of lactate, a herald of poor prognosis and multi-organ failure (MOF) after I/R injury. In addition, the increase in lipid metabolism generates ketone bodies and activates peroxisome proliferating-activated receptors (PPARs), both of which have been shown to be protective against I/R injury.

== See also ==
- Crush syndrome
- Ischemic stroke
- Myocardial infarction — Reperfusion
- Therapeutic hypothermia
- Hypothermia therapy for neonatal encephalopathy
- Remote ischemic conditioning
- Ischemia-reperfusion injury of the appendicular musculoskeletal system
