= Henrik Hagberg =

Swedish physician and neuroscientist

Professor Henrik Hagberg
- Born: 31 March 1955 (age 71); Stockholm
- Scientific career
- Fields: Experimental Brain Research
- Workplaces: King's College London, Imperial College London, Sahlgrenska Academy

Henrik Erik Gustav Hagberg (born 31 March 1955) is a Swedish physician and neuroscientist. His research focuses on experimental brain research, perinatal medicine and obstetrics. He holds the Research Chair in Fetal Medicine at the Centre for the Developing Brain at King's College London, and is one of the world's most highly cited researchers in the field of perinatal brain injury. According to Google Scholar, his work has been cited over 33,000 times in scientific literature, and he has an h-index of 107.

He has formerly been Professor of Obstetrics and Perinatal Medicine at Imperial College London and Professor in the same field at Sahlgrenska Academy in Sweden. He has published over 400 articles.

He is the son of the paediatric surgeon Sture Hagberg, director of paediatric surgery at the Gothenburg Eastern Hospital.
