= Management of acute coronary syndrome =

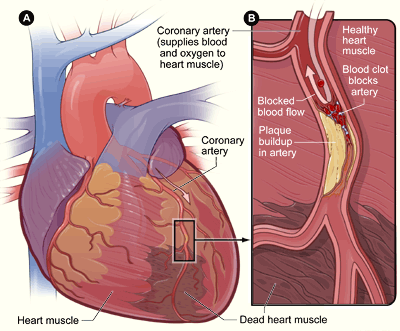
- Acute coronary syndromes are commonly caused by a blood clot forming on an atherosclerotic plaque in a coronary artery. Oxygen delivery to a part of heart muscle is blocked, eventually causing cell death.
- Specialty: Cardiology

Management of acute coronary syndrome is targeted against the effects of reduced blood flow to the affected area of the heart muscle, usually because of a blood clot in one of the coronary arteries, the vessels that supply oxygenated blood to the myocardium. This is achieved with urgent hospitalization and medical therapy, including drugs that relieve chest pain and reduce the size of the infarct, and drugs that inhibit clot formation; for a subset of patients, invasive measures are also employed (coronary angiography and percutaneous coronary intervention). Basic principles of management are the same for all types of acute coronary syndrome. However, some important aspects of treatment depend on the presence or absence of elevation of the ST segment on the electrocardiogram, which classifies cases upon presentation to either ST segment elevation myocardial infarction (STEMI) or non-ST elevation acute coronary syndrome (NST-ACS); the latter includes unstable angina and non-ST elevation myocardial infarction (NSTEMI). Treatment is generally more aggressive for STEMI patients, and reperfusion therapy is more often reserved for them. Long-term therapy is necessary for prevention of recurrent events and complications.

== General principles ==
Acute coronary syndromes are caused by a sudden, critical reduction in blood flow in one of the coronary arteries, the vessels that supply oxygenated blood to the myocardium (heart muscle), typically by a blood clot. The principal symptom is typically chest pain, known as angina pectoris; people who present with angina must prompt evaluation for possible acute coronary syndrome.

Acute coronary syndromes are classified into two major categories, according to the patient's electrocardiogram, and specifically the presence or absence of persistent (>20 min) ST segment elevation (or left bundle branch block). Patients with acute coronary syndrome and ST elevation are said to have ST-elevation myocardial infarction (STEMI), and they tend to have one of their coronary arteries totally blocked. Damage is reversible for approximately 20-30 minutes after complete obstruction of blood flow; thereafter myocardial cell death ensues and progresses as time passes. Therefore, complete and sustained restoration of blood flow must be as prompt as possible to ensure maximum salvage of functional myocardium, a principle expressed in the maxim "time is muscle". This is achieved with reperfusion therapy, which is based on invasive reopening of the affected coronary artery with primary percutaneous coronary intervention, or non-invasive breaking up of the responsible blood clot with a thrombolytic drug.

Patients without ST-segment elevation are said to have non-ST-elevation acute coronary syndrome and tend not to have full occlusion of a coronary artery. If there is evidence of myocardial cell death (especially elevated cardiac biomarkers), they are considered to have a non-ST-elevation myocardial infarction (NSTEMI); otherwise, they are classified with unstable angina. Their management is based on the estimation of their risk for adverse events. Patients at low risk can be adequately treated with medical therapy, in many ways similar to the one used for STEMI (but excluding thrombolytics). Those at moderate to high risk benefit from an early invasive strategy, which includes coronary angiography and, if necessary, revascularization with percutaneous coronary intervention or coronary artery bypass surgery.

Medical therapy for acute coronary syndromes is based on drugs that act against ischemia and resultant angina and limit the infarct size (i.e., the area of myocardium affected), as well as drugs that inhibit clot formation. The latter include antiplatelet agents, which block the activation and aggregation of platelets (cellular blood components that contribute to clot formation), and anticoagulant agents (which attenuate the coagulation cascade). Long-term therapy in acute coronary syndrome survivors is targeted against recurrence and long-term complications (secondary prevention).

Women are taken less seriously than men when they have a heart attack, leading to higher mortality among women.

== Patient-dependent initial measures ==
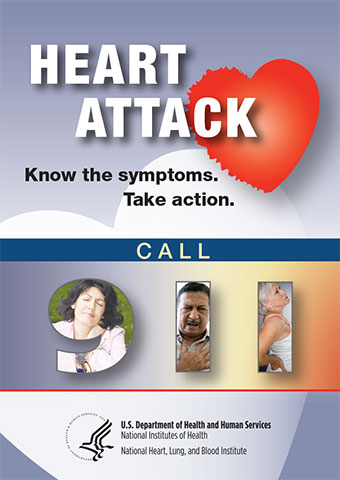
Information card published by the National Heart, Lung, and Blood Institute urging people with symptoms of angina to call the emergency medical services.

Because of the relationship between the duration of myocardial ischemia and the extent of damage to heart muscle, public health services encourage people experiencing possible acute coronary syndrome symptoms or those around them to immediately call emergency medical services.

Patients with known coronary artery disease who have been prescribed nitroglycerin should promptly take one dose, and call emergency medical services if their symptoms do not improve within 2–5 minutes. Chewing non−enteric-coated aspirin is encouraged (unless there are contraindications).

Patients should stay calm in a comfortable position. In case of heart attack, it would not usually be lying down, but sitting or sitting with folded knees (but patients would notice the position that fits for them).

Patients should not be transported to the hospital by private vehicle instead of an ambulance, unless evacuation by land or air ambulance is impossible (e.g., dangerous weather in a very remote area), and if they must be, it should be done if possible with someone trained in cardiac first aid.

Health care professionals are responsible for teaching their patients at risk of acute coronary syndrome what the symptoms of this condition are, and that it is imperative to seek urgent medical attention in case they present.

== Emergency services ==
Emergency Medical Services (EMS) Systems vary considerably in their ability to evaluate and treat patients with suspected acute myocardial infarction. Some provide only first aid and early defibrillation. Others employ highly trained paramedics with sophisticated technology and advanced protocols. Paramedic services are capable of providing oxygen, IV access, sublingual nitroglycerine, morphine, and aspirin. Some advanced paramedic systems can also perform 12-lead ECGs. If a STEMI is recognized, the paramedic may be able to contact the local PCI hospital and alert the emergency room physician and staff of the suspected AMI. Some paramedic services can provide thrombolytic therapy in the prehospital setting, allowing reperfusion of the myocardium.

With primary PCI emerging as the preferred therapy for ST-segment elevation myocardial infarction, EMS can play a key role in reducing door-to-balloon intervals (the time from presentation to a hospital ER to the restoration of coronary artery blood flow) by performing a 12-lead ECG in the field and using this information to triage the patient to the most appropriate medical facility. In addition, the 12-lead ECG can be transmitted to the receiving hospital, which enables time-saving decisions to be made before the arrival of the patient. This may include a "cardiac alert" or "STEMI alert" that calls in off-duty personnel in areas where the cardiac cath lab is not staffed 24 hours a day. Even in the absence of a formal alerting program, prehospital 12-lead ECGs are independently associated with reduced door-to-treatment intervals in the emergency department.

== Initial diagnostic approach ==
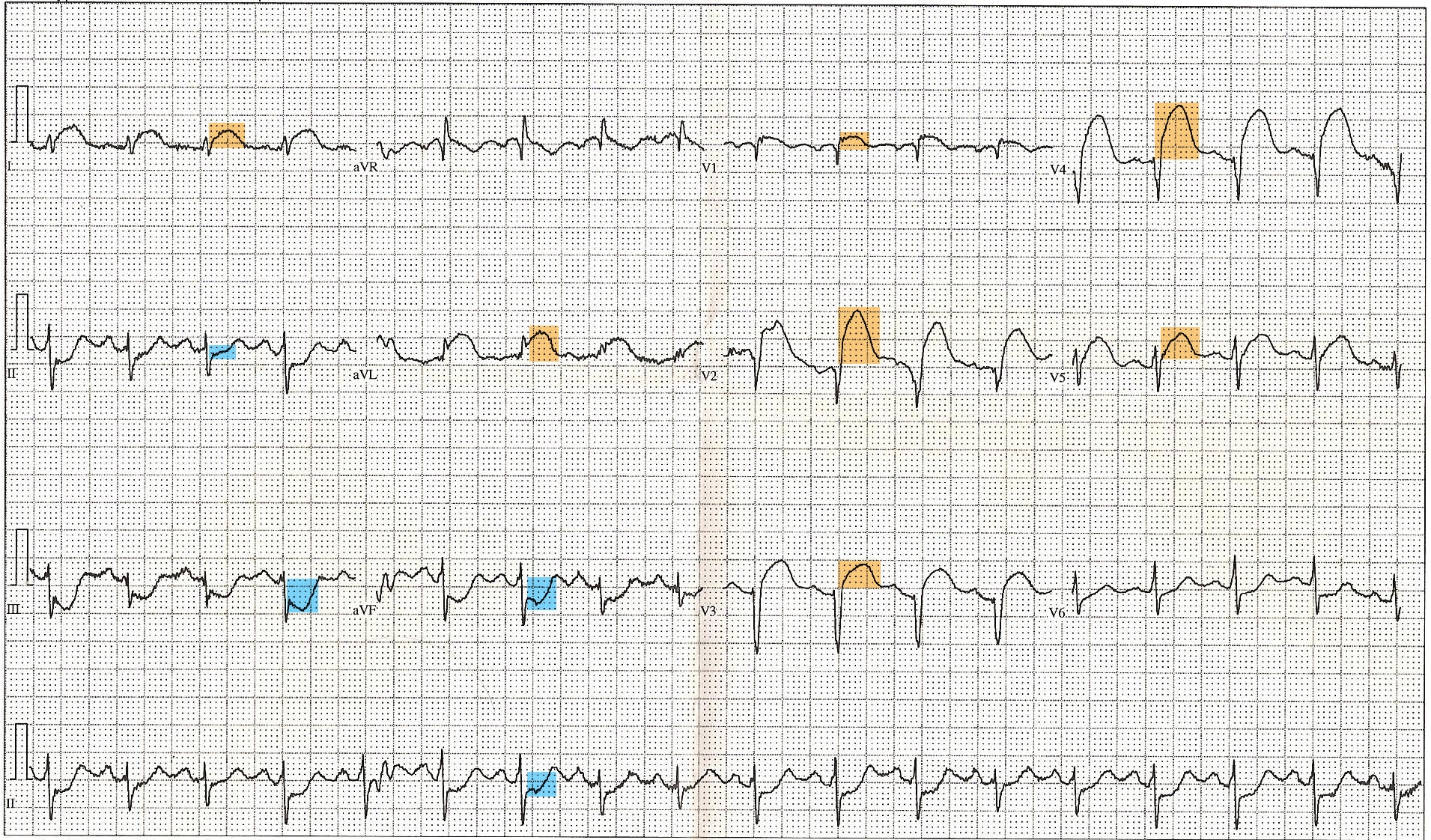
Typical electrocardiogram of an ST segment elevation myocardial infarction. ST elevation in leads I, aVL and V1-V5 indicates an anterior wall myocardial infarction and is shown in orange; reciprocal ST depression in leads II, III and aVF is shown in blue.

In patients with symptoms typical of myocardial ischemia an electrocardiogram must be immediately obtained - e.g., within 10 minutes from first contact with medical or paramedical personnel, including prehospital setting; the electrocardiographic findings will guide the subsequent management. Patients with elevation of the ST segment (or presumed new left bundle branch block) are treated based on guidelines for ST elevation myocardial infarction (STEMI) and must undergo reperfusion therapy as soon as possible. Serum cardiac biomarkers are routinely obtained and their elevation is necessary for confirming diagnosis of myocardial infarction; however, reperfusion must not be delayed by waiting for the results. Patients without the above findings are initially classified with non-ST elevation acute coronary syndrome, and subsequent cardiac biomarker results will differentiate between true non ST elevation myocardial infarction (NSTEMI) and unstable angina.

== Relief of angina ==
Relief of anginal pain is of paramount importance, not only for humane reasons but because pain is associated with sympathetic activation that causes vasoconstriction and increases the heart's workload. The pain of myocardial ischemia is likely to respond to any intervention that improves the relationship between oxygen demand and supply, like nitrates, beta blockers, and oxygen.

=== Nitrates ===
Nitrates, like nitroglycerin, dilate blood vessels, which is beneficial against myocardial ischemia in two ways: By increasing blood flow in the coronary arteries and the amount of oxygen that arrives to heart muscle; and by relaxing all blood vessels in the body, thereby reducing the workload that heart needs to produce against them and the oxygen it consumes. The preferred mode of administration is sublingually. By relaxing blood vessels, nitrates also reduce blood pressure, which must be carefully monitored; they must not be used if hypotension is present. They must also be avoided in patients who have taken sildenafil or other phosphodiesterase type 5 inhibitors (used for erectile dysfunction) within the previous 24–48 hours, as the combination of the two could cause a serious drop in blood pressure. Intravenous nitrates are useful in patients with hypertension or pulmonary edema.

=== Beta blockers ===
By reducing sympathetic stimulation of the heart, beta blockers decrease heart rate, blood pressure, and cardiac output, and hence heart oxygen consumption. Beta-blockers alleviate ischemic pain and have also been proven to reduce the size of infarcted heart muscle, the risk of arrhythmias, and the proportion of patients with acute coronary syndrome who actually evolve STEMI. However, they have also been shown to increase the risk of acute heart failure. Their early use is contraindicated if there are signs of congestive heart failure (e.g., Killip class II or above) or hypotension, along with other contraindications to beta blockers (slow heart rate, atrioventricular block); in the absence of contraindications beta blocker therapy should begin in the first 24 hours. It may be prudent to prefer oral rather than intravenous forms.

=== Oxygen therapy ===
Initial administration of oxygen to all patients with acute coronary syndrome is common practice; however, there is no evidence to support or refute that supplemental oxygen might be harmful or beneficial for cardiac patients who do not need it. It is currently recommended to give oxygen only to breathless patients or when blood oxygen saturation is low, e.g. <90%.

=== Analgesics ===
Analgesic agents that are most commonly used are opioids, and especially morphine, which is considered the analgesic of choice in patients with ST elevation. Along with its pain-controlling properties, morphine also reduces the work of breathing, alleviates breathlessness, reduces anxiety, and has favorable actions on hemodynamic parameters and cardiac oxygen consumption. However, in patients presenting without ST elevation, morphine has been shown to have adverse events potential, and its use is considered acceptable only after inadequate pain relief by medication specific against angina. Non-steroidal anti-inflammatory drugs are contraindicated for both categories of patients.

== Antiplatelet drugs ==
All patients with acute coronary syndrome must immediately receive antiplatelet therapy, including aspirin and generally a second oral antiplatelet agent. Bleeding is the most common and clinically significant adverse effect of antiplatelet therapy, frequently dictating the choice of agent and duration of dual antiplatelet treatment.

=== Aspirin ===
Aspirin inhibits platelet aggregation and formation of blood clots. It is effective across the entire spectrum of acute coronary syndromes; it has been shown to reduce the rate of death in patients with STEMI and in patients presenting without ST elevation. Aspirin is contraindicated in patients with documented allergy or known platelet disorder. Patients who have had gastrointestinal symptoms while on long-term aspirin therapy are usually able to tolerate aspirin in the short term. For patients with true intolerance to aspirin, clopidogrel is recommended. Lower doses need days to achieve full antiplatelet effect; therefore, a loading dose is necessary for patients who are not already on aspirin.

=== P2Y_{12} inhibitors ===
Aside from aspirin, three antiplatelet agents taken by mouth have been approved for use in acute coronary syndromes, clopidogrel, ticagrelor and prasugrel; all reduce platelet aggregation by inhibiting the P2Y_{12} receptor, a type of adenosine phosphate receptor, on the surface of platelets. Not all three of them are equally indicated in all types of acute coronary syndromes. In patients with ST elevation the choice of P2Y_{12} inhibitor depends on reperfusion strategy; for patients undergoing primary percutaneous coronary intervention ticagrelor and prasugrel are considered superior to clopidogrel, as they are more potent and have more rapid onset of action, at the cost of some increase in bleeding risk; for STEMI patients who are treated with fibrinolysis and those who do not undergo reperfusion treatment only clopidogrel is indicated. Prasugrel must not be given to patients with a history of ischemic stroke or aged 75 years or older. In patients with non-ST elevation acute coronary syndrome, current guidelines also recommend immediate administration of dual antiplatelet therapy upon diagnosis; clopidogrel and ticagrelor are indicated in this setting, with ticagrelor considered superior for patients undergoing early invasive strategy (see later). However, emerging evidence questions this strategy. As with aspirin, it is necessary to administer a loading dose.

=== Glycoprotein IIb/IIIa inhibitors ===
Glycoprotein IIb/IIIa inhibitors are a class of intravenous antiplatelet agents used in patients undergoing percutaneous coronary intervention, consisting of abciximab, eptifibatide, and tirofiban. Patients presenting with ST elevation that will be reperfused with percutaneous coronary intervention may receive one of the above agents at the time of catheterization, or perhaps before. Administering eptifibatide or tirofiban may also be reasonable in patients presenting with NST-ACS who are considered of intermediate or high risk and are treated with an early invasive strategy.

== Anticoagulants ==
Anticoagulants in acute coronary syndrome are targeted against the coronary blood clot, as well as towards prevention of thrombotic complications, like formation of blood clots in the ventricles, stroke, pulmonary embolism, or deep vein thrombosis. Patients undergoing PCI also need an anticoagulant to prevent catheter thrombosis. Options include unfractionated heparin, enoxaparin (a low molecular weight heparin), fondaparinux (a pentasaccharide antagonist of factor Xa) and bivalirudin (a direct thrombin inhibitor); all the above agents are given parenterally (subcutaneously or intravenously). Unfractionated heparin has the disadvantage of requiring dose adjustment based on a laboratory exam, activated partial thromboplastin time (APTT). In STEMI patients choice depends on the reperfusion strategy used (see below); bivalirudin is used when PCI is employed only, while in the same cases, fondaparinux is not preferred. Similarly, in Non-STE ACS, bivalirudin too is only used when an early invasive strategy is chosen.

== Reperfusion ==
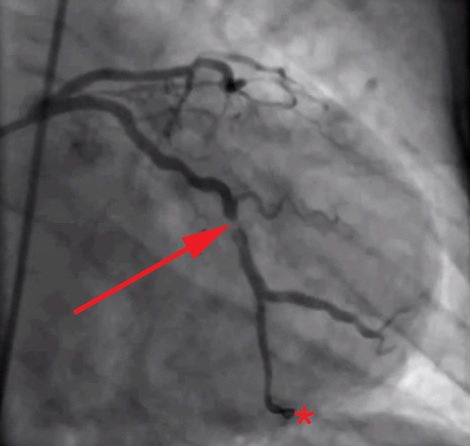
Coronary angiography of a patient with acute myocardial infarction presenting with ST elevation and undergoing primary percutaneous coronary intervention; arrow points at partial occlusion of left circumflex coronary artery; star indicates tip of the guide wire that has been inserted in the artery through the occlusion.

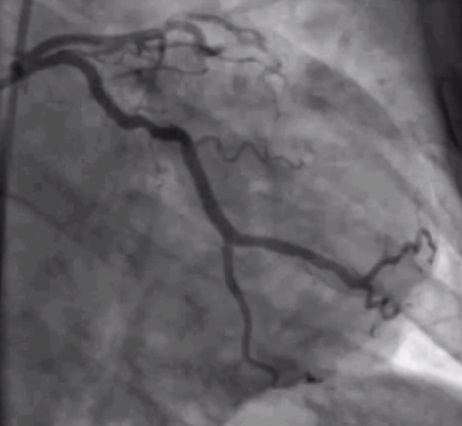
Coronary angiography of the same patient, after dilation of the artery with a balloon and placement of stent. The occlusion has been successfully treated.

The concept of reperfusion has become so central to the modern treatment of acute myocardial infarction that we are said to be in the reperfusion era. Patients who present with suspected acute myocardial infarction and ST segment elevation (STEMI) or new bundle branch block on the 12 lead ECG are presumed to have an occlusive thrombosis in an epicardial coronary artery. They are therefore candidates for immediate reperfusion, either with thrombolytic therapy, percutaneous coronary intervention (PCI) or when these therapies are unsuccessful, bypass surgery.

Individuals without ST-segment elevation are presumed to be experiencing either unstable angina (UA) or non-ST-segment elevation myocardial infarction (NSTEMI). They receive many of the same initial therapies and are often stabilized with antiplatelet drugs and anticoagulated. If their condition remains (hemodynamically) stable, they can be offered either late coronary angiography with subsequent restoration of blood flow (revascularization), or non-invasive stress testing to determine if there is significant ischemia that would benefit from revascularization. If hemodynamic instability develops in individuals with NSTEMIs, they may undergo urgent coronary angiography and subsequent revascularization. The use of thrombolytic agents is contraindicated in this patient subset, however.

The basis for this distinction in treatment regimens is that ST-segment elevations on an ECG are typically due to complete occlusion of a coronary artery. On the other hand, in NSTEMIs, there is typically a sudden narrowing of a coronary artery with preserved (but diminished) flow to the distal myocardium. Anticoagulation and antiplatelet agents are given to prevent the narrowed artery from occluding.

At least 10% of patients with STEMI do not develop myocardial necrosis (as evidenced by a rise in cardiac markers) and subsequent Q waves on EKG after reperfusion therapy. Such a successful restoration of flow to the infarct-related artery during an acute myocardial infarction is known as "aborting" the myocardial infarction. If treated within the hour, about 25% of STEMIs can be aborted.

== Rehabilitation ==
Additional objectives are preventing life-threatening arrhythmias or conduction disturbances. This requires monitoring in a coronary care unit and protocolized administration of antiarrhythmic agents. Antiarrhythmic agents are typically only given to individuals with life-threatening arrhythmias after a myocardial infarction and not to suppress the ventricular ectopy that is often seen after a myocardial infarction.

Cardiac rehabilitation aims to optimize function and quality of life in those affected by a heart disease. This can be with the help of a physician or in the form of a cardiac rehabilitation program.

Physical exercise is an important part of rehabilitation after a myocardial infarction, with beneficial effects on cholesterol levels, blood pressure, weight, stress and mood. Some patients become afraid of exercising because it might trigger another infarct. Patients are encouraged to exercise, and should only avoid certain exerting activities. Local authorities may place limitations on driving motor vehicles. In most cases, the advice is a gradual increase in physical exercise during about 6–8 weeks following an MI. If it doesn't feel too hard for the patient, the advice about exercise is then the same as applies to anyone else to gain health benefits, that is, at least 20–30 minutes of moderate exercise on most days (at least five days per week) to the extent of getting slightly short of breath.

Some people are afraid to have sex after a heart attack. Most people can resume sexual activities after 3 to 4 weeks. The amount of activity needs to be adjusted to the patient's capabilities.

== Special cases ==
=== Cocaine ===
Cocaine associated myocardial infarction should be managed like other patients with acute coronary syndrome, except that beta blockers should not be used and benzodiazepines should be administered early. The treatment itself may have complications. If attempts to restore blood flow are initiated after a critical period of only a few hours, the result may be reperfusion injury instead of amelioration.

=== Wilderness setting ===
In wilderness first aid, a possible heart attack justifies evacuation by the fastest available means, often meaning the initiation of a MEDEVAC. The suspicion or provisional diagnosis of an MI means that it is inappropriate for the patient to walk out of the wilderness setting and will require them to be carried or conveyed in a vehicle. Aspirin, nitroglycerin, and oxygen can all be given with relative ease in a wilderness setting and should be administered as soon as possible in suspected cases of MI. Wilderness management of cardiac arrest differs slightly from that carried out in an urban setting in that it is generally considered acceptable to terminate a resuscitation attempt after 30 minutes if there has been no change in the patient's condition.

=== Air travel ===
Certified personnel traveling by commercial aircraft may be able to assist an MI patient by using the on-board first aid kit, which may contain some cardiac drugs (such as glyceryl trinitrate spray, aspirin, or opioid painkillers), an AED, and oxygen. Pilots may divert the flight to land at a nearby airport. Cardiac monitors are being introduced by some airlines, and they can be used by both on-board and ground-based physicians.
