= Zalunfiban =

Clinical data
- Trade names: Disaggpro
- Other names: RUC-4
- Routes of administration: Subcutaneous

Legal status
- Legal status: Investigational

Pharmacokinetic data
- Onset of action: 15 minutes
- Elimination half-life: ~1 hour
- Duration of action: 4 hours
- Excretion: Renal (major), fecal (minor)

Identifiers
- IUPAC name: 2-amino-N-[5-(5-oxo-7-piperazin-1-yl-[1,3,4]thiadiazolo[3,2-a]pyrimidin-2-yl)-3-pyridinyl]acetamide
- PubChem CID: 71668132
- DrugBank: DB18766
- UNII: 5XQC91CO1F
- KEGG: D12051
- ChEMBL: ChEMBL3114577

Chemical and physical data
- Formula: C_{16}H_{18}N_{8}O_{2}S
- Molar mass: 386.43 g·mol^{−1}
- InChI: InChI=1S/C16H18N8O2S/c17-7-13(25)20-11-5-10(8-19-9-11)15-22-24-14(26)6-12(21-16(24)27-15)23-3-1-18-2-4-23/h5-6,8-9,18H,1-4,7,17H2,(H,20,25); Key:LTVKZVGAALCRFW-UHFFFAOYSA-N

Zalunfiban (INN; code name RUC-4, proposed trade name Disaggpro) is an antiplatelet drug of the glycoprotein IIb/IIIa inhibitors class. It is intended for the emergency prehospital treatment of ST elevation myocardial infarction (STEMI), a type of heart attack with specific ECG findings.

It was discovered by Barry S. Coller at Rockefeller University and is being developed by CeleCor Therapeutics, a company he founded specifically for this purpose.

== Pharmacology ==
Administered subcutaneously, it achieves potent inhibition of platelet aggregation within 15 minutes and has an effect duration of approximately two hours, making it suitable for emergency use. Its mechanism of action involves binding to the glycoprotein IIb/IIIa receptor on platelets, displacing the magnesium ion at the receptor's MIDAS site (Metal Ion-Dependent Adhesion Site), and locking the receptor in an inactive conformation. This prevents platelet aggregation induced by various activators including thrombin, thromboxane, and ADP, without inducing thrombocytopenia.

== Clinical trials ==
The first human trials of zalunfiban were conducted in 2019 and published in 2020. Phase III trial results were presented in November 2025.

== History ==
In the early 2000s, Coller's team at the Rockefeller University Laboratory of Blood and Vascular Biology used high-throughput screening to find new small molecule chemical compounds with potential antiplatelet activity directed at the platelet integrin α_{IIb}β_{3} protein complex (also known as glycoprotein IIb/IIIa). Among more than 30,000 screened compounds, they identified one (later codenamed RUC-1) with a unique mechanism of action, which was selected for further development.

Structure-based drug design techniques were then used to develop a congener of RUC-1 (RUC-2), with 100 times greater potency to block platelet aggregation. However, despite excellent results in animal testing and favorable pharmacokinetic and pharmacodynamic properties, it was not soluble enough for the intended purpose, which was to be formulated as an autoinjector for emergency use by first responders or during transport of heart attack victims to hospital before intravenous (IV) access could be obtained. Further molecular modification (changing the benzene ring of RUC-2 to a pyridine ring) yielded RUC-4 (zalunfiban), which was even more potent and soluble enough to be administered by intramuscular or subcutaneous injection.
