= International Studies of Infarct Survival =

Studies of heart attack survival

The International Studies of Infarct Survival (ISIS) were four randomized controlled trials of several drugs for treating suspected acute myocardial infarction ("heart attack"). More than 134,000 patients from over 20 countries took part in four large simple trials between 1981 and 1993, coordinated from Oxford, England.

== ISIS-1 ==
The First International Study of Infarct Survival (ISIS-1) was a placebo-controlled trial of the beta-blocker atenolol. It recruited 16,027 patients and was completed in 1985.

== ISIS-2 ==
The Second International Study of Infarct Survival (ISIS-2) was a 2×2 factorial placebo-controlled trial of aspirin and the thrombolytic drug streptokinase. It recruited 17,187 patients and was completed in 1988.

== ISIS-3 ==
The Third International Study of Infarct Survival (ISIS-3) was a 3×2 factorial trial that compared the three thrombolytic drugs streptokinase, tissue plasminogen activator (tPA) and anistreplase to each other, and also compared the anticoagulant heparin to no heparin. All patients were also given aspirin. It recruited 41,299 patients and was completed in 1991.

== ISIS-4 ==
The Fourth International Study of Infarct Survival (ISIS-4) was a 2×2×2 factorial placebo-controlled trial of the angiotensin-converting enzyme inhibitor (ACE inhibitor) captopril, isosorbide mononitrate and magnesium sulphate. It recruited 58,050 patients and was completed in 1993.

== See also ==
- GISSI, an Italian group who conducted four similar large clinical trials
- Thrombolysis In Myocardial Infarction (TIMI)
- Myocardial infarction management
