= Ro-44-3888 =

Chemical compound

Identifiers
- CAS Number: 144412-18-0
- PubChem CID: 9907685
- ChemSpider: 8083337
- UNII: F23PXB8U2L
- ChEMBL: ChEMBL65267
- CompTox Dashboard (EPA): DTXSID101029735

Chemical and physical data
- Formula: C_{18}H_{24}N_{4}O_{5}
- Molar mass: 376.413 g·mol^{−1}
- 3D model (JSmol): Interactive image
- SMILES: C[C@@H](C(=O)N1CCC(CC1)OCC(=O)O)NC(=O)C2=CC=C(C=C2)C(=N)N
- InChI: InChI=1S/C18H24N4O5/c1-11(21-17(25)13-4-2-12(3-5-13)16(19)20)18(26)22-8-6-14(7-9-22)27-10-15(23)24/h2-5,11,14H,6-10H2,1H3,(H3,19,20)(H,21,25)(H,23,24)/t11-/m0/s1; Key:BHOGTSLQMNCJHA-NSHDSACASA-N

Ro 44-3888 is a non-peptidic, selective and reversible glycoprotein IIb/IIIa inhibitor. It is the active metabolite of sibrafiban. It was being investigated as a treatment for heart conditions, including myocardial infarctions. The development of Ro 44-3888 and sibrafiban was discontinued in 1999 following unfavorable Phase III efficacy data.

== See also ==
- Tirofiban
