= Sibrafiban =

Chemical compound

Identifiers
- IUPAC name: [Z]-(S)-[[1-[2-[[4-(amino-hydroxyiminomethyl)-benzoyl]amino]-1-oxopropyl]-4-piperidinyl]oxyl]-acetic ethyl ester
- CAS Number: 170094-62-9
- PubChem CID: 5491394
- ChemSpider: 4590509
- UNII: YUE443B0NF
- KEGG: D05834
- ChEMBL: ChEMBL435176
- CompTox Dashboard (EPA): DTXSID90938247

Chemical and physical data
- Formula: C_{20}H_{28}N_{4}O_{6}
- Molar mass: 420.466 g·mol^{−1}
- 3D model (JSmol): Interactive image
- SMILES: CCOC(=O)COC1CCN(CC1)C(=O)[C@H](C)NC(=O)c2ccc(cc2)C(=N)NO
- InChI: InChI=1S/C20H28N4O6/c1-3-29-17(25)12-30-16-8-10-24(11-9-16)20(27)13(2)22-19(26)15-6-4-14(5-7-15)18(21)23-28/h4-7,13,16,28H,3,8-12H2,1-2H3,(H2,21,23)(H,22,26)/t13-/m0/s1; Key:WBNUCLPUOSXSNJ-ZDUSSCGKSA-N

Sibrafiban (Ro 48–3657, proposed brand name Xubix) is the double prodrug of Ro-44-3888, which is a platelet aggregation inhibitor. It was being developed for secondary prevention of arterial thrombosis following unstable angina pectoris and acute myocardial infarction (MI). On August 6, 1999, Hoffmann-La Roche announced that the preliminary results from Phase III clinical trials had not shown that sibrafiban was better than aspirin in preventing recurrent ischemic events in patients with acute coronary syndrome. The development of sibrafiban was terminated.

== See also ==
- Tirofiban
