= Ketorolac =

Nonsteroidal anti-inflammatory drug (NSAID; analgesic)

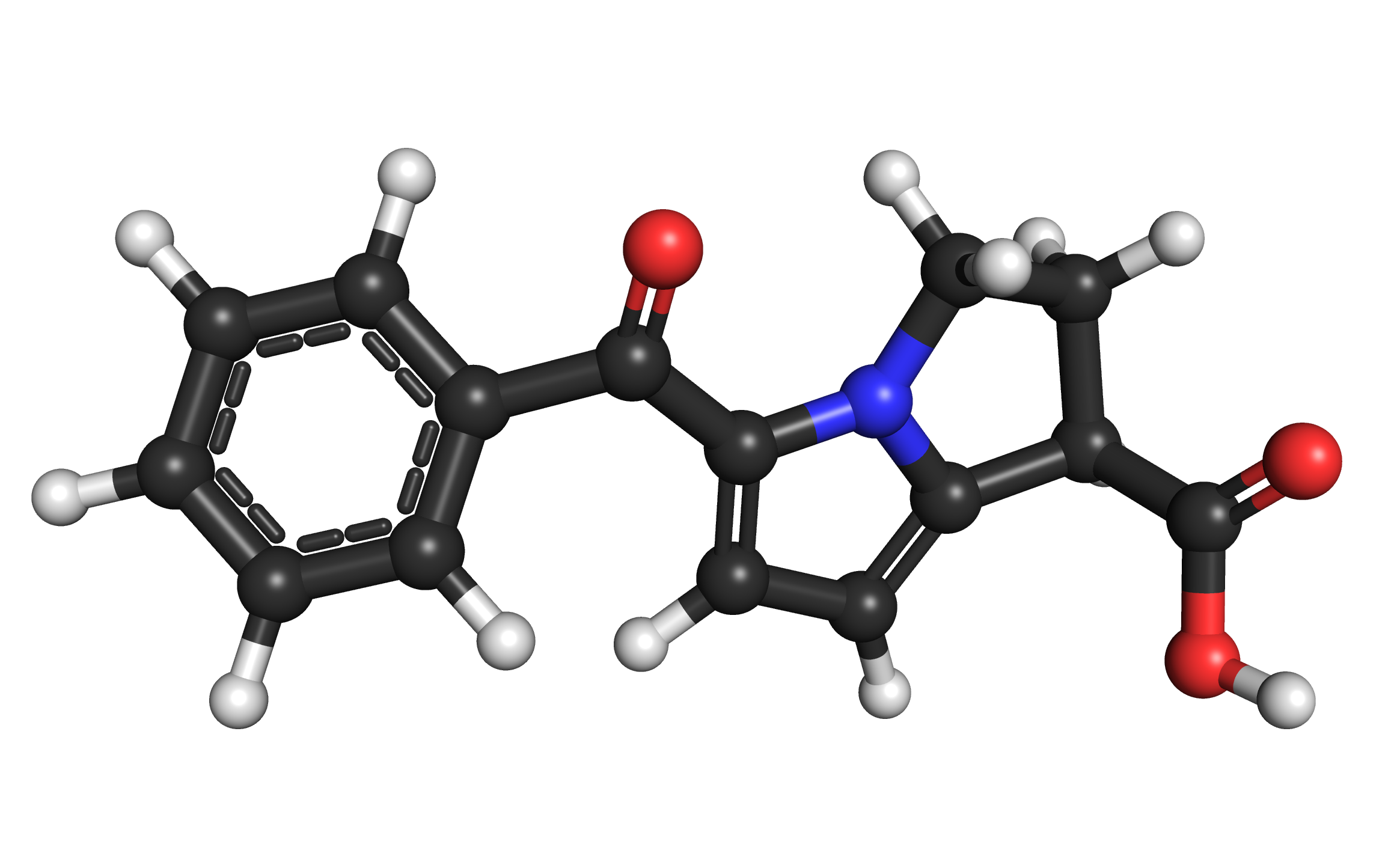
- Above: molecular structure of ketorolac Below: 3D representation of a ketorolac molecule

Clinical data
- Trade names: Toradol, Acular, Sprix, others
- Other names: Ketorolac tromethamine
- AHFS/Drugs.com: Monograph
- MedlinePlus: a693001
- License data: US DailyMed: Ketorolac
- Pregnancy category: AU: C
- Routes of administration: By mouth, under the tongue, intramuscular, intravenous, eye drops, nasal spray
- ATC code: M01AB15 (WHO) S01BC05 (WHO)

Legal status
- Legal status: AU: S4 (Prescription only); CA: ℞-only; UK: POM; US: ℞-only

Pharmacokinetic data
- Bioavailability: 80% (oral) 100% IV/IM
- Metabolism: Liver
- Elimination half-life: 4 to 6 hours, young adults; 4.7 h to 8.6 h, elderly (mean age 72)
- Excretion: Kidney: 90% (mean); Biliary: 6.1% (mean)

Identifiers
- IUPAC name: (±)-5-benzoyl-2,3-dihydro-1H-pyrrolizine-1-carboxylic acid
- CAS Number: 74103-06-3
- PubChem CID: 3826
- DrugBank: DB00465
- ChemSpider: 3694
- UNII: YZI5105V0L
- KEGG: D08104
- ChEBI: CHEBI:6129
- ChEMBL: ChEMBL469
- PDB ligand: KTR (PDBe, RCSB PDB)
- CompTox Dashboard (EPA): DTXSID8023189
- ECHA InfoCard: 100.110.314

Chemical and physical data
- Formula: C_{15}H_{13}NO_{3}
- Molar mass: 255.273 g·mol^{−1}
- 3D model (JSmol): Interactive image
- Chirality: Racemic mixture
- SMILES: O=C(c1ccc2n1CCC2C(=O)O)c3ccccc3
- InChI: InChI=1S/C15H13NO3/c17-14(10-4-2-1-3-5-10)13-7-6-12-11(15(18)19)8-9-16(12)13/h1-7,11H,8-9H2,(H,18,19); Key:OZWKMVRBQXNZKK-UHFFFAOYSA-N

Ketorolac, sold under the brand names Toradol, Acular and Sprix, among others, is a nonsteroidal anti-inflammatory drug (NSAID) used for the short-term treatment of moderate to severe pain. Its use is generally limited to no more than five days because extended treatment increases the risk of serious adverse effects. It can be taken by mouth, by nose, by injection into a vein or muscle, and as eye drops. Effects begin within an hour and last for up to eight hours. Ketorolac also has antipyretic (fever-reducing) properties.

Common side effects include sleepiness, dizziness, abdominal pain, swelling, and nausea. Serious side effects may include stomach bleeding, kidney failure, heart attacks, bronchospasm, heart failure, and anaphylaxis. Use is not recommended during the last part of pregnancy or during breastfeeding. Ketorolac works by blocking cyclooxygenase 1 and 2 (COX1 and COX2), thereby decreasing production of prostaglandins.

Ketorolac was patented in 1976 and approved for medical use in 1989. It is available as a generic medication. In 2023, it was the 228th most commonly prescribed medication in the United States, with more than one million prescriptions.

Due to a series of deaths due to gastrointestinal bleeding and kidney failure, ketorolac as a pain medication was removed from the German market in 1993. When ketorolac was introduced into Germany, it was often used as an opioid replacement in pain therapy because its side effects were perceived as much less severe, it did not produce any dependence, and a dose was effective for 7–8 hours, compared to morphine's 3–4 hours. As a very potent prostaglandin inhibitor, ketorolac diminishes the kidney's own defenses against vasoconstriction-related effects, e.g. during blood loss or high endogenous catecholamine levels.

== Medical uses ==
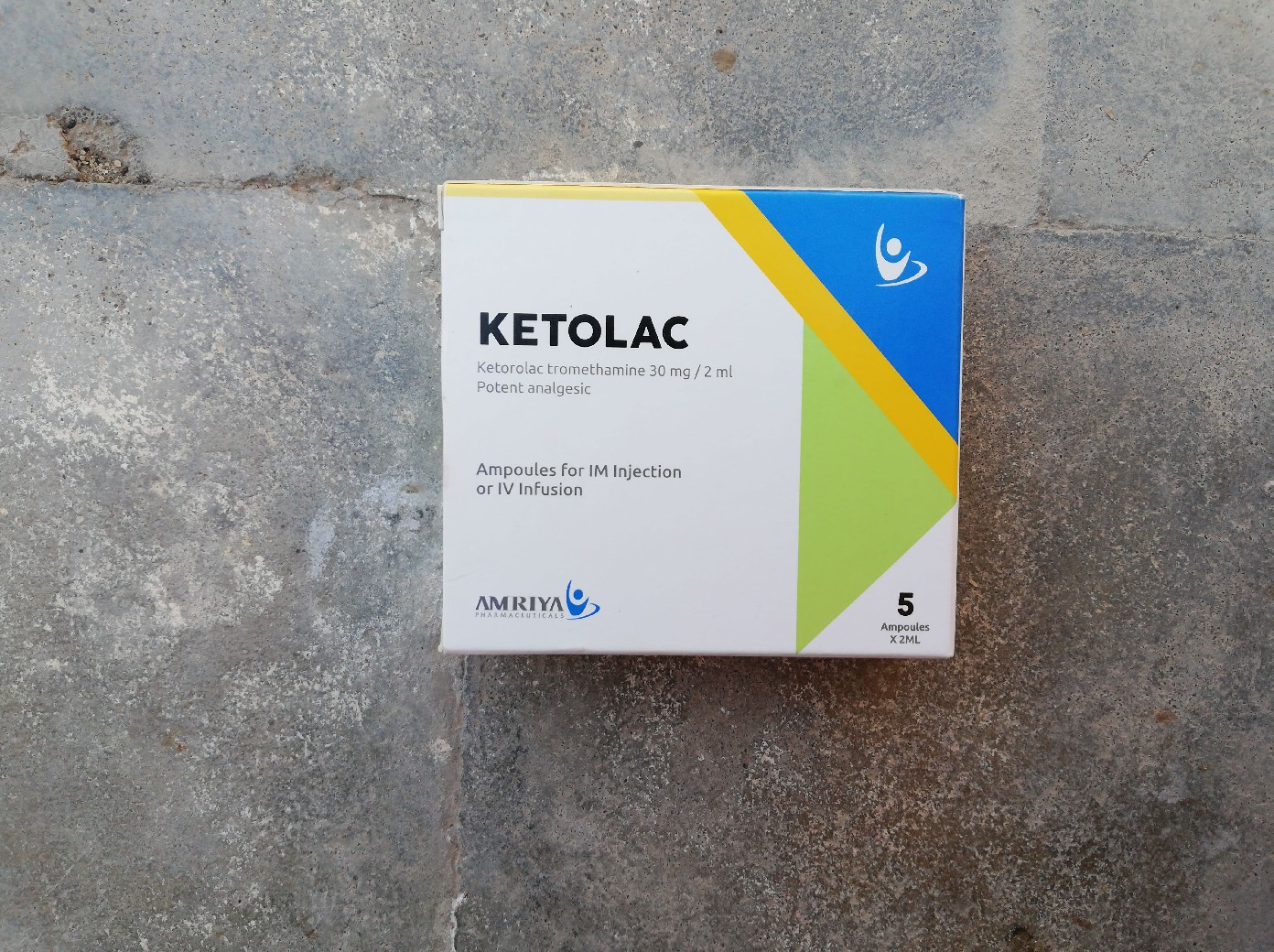
Injectable ketorolac as sold in India

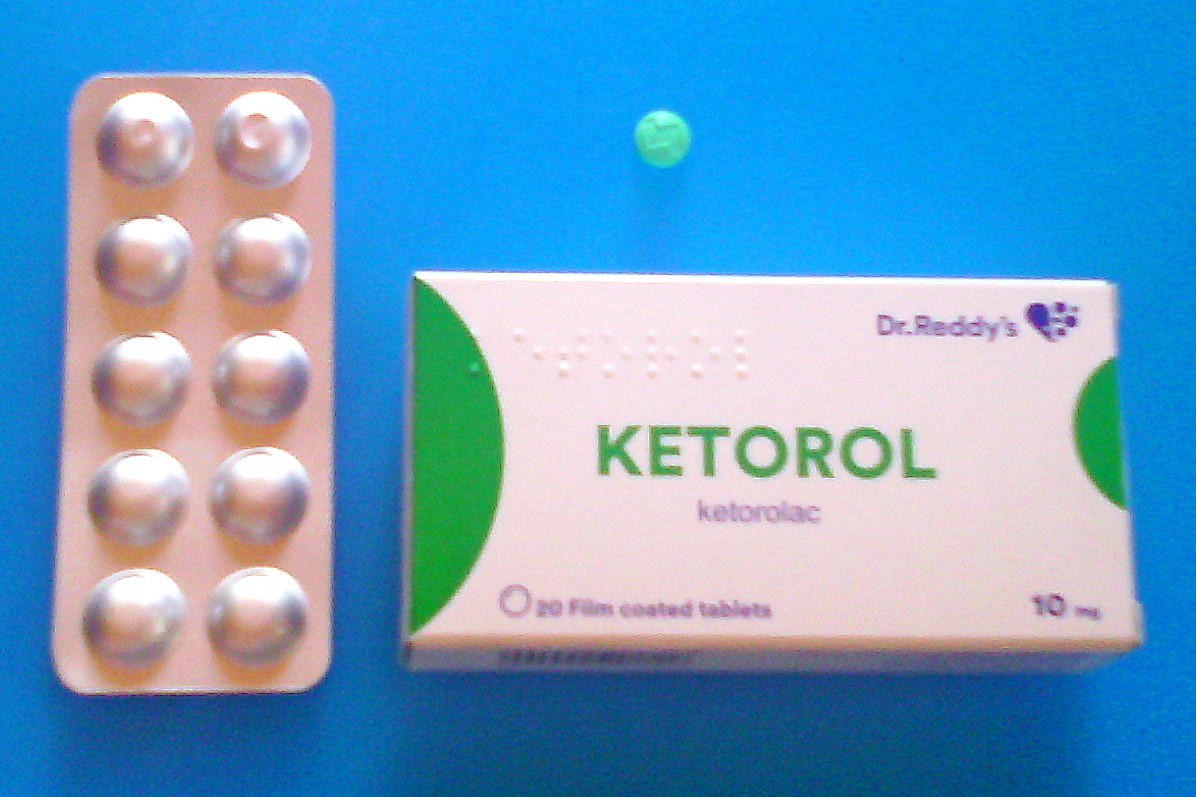
Package of ketorolac pills from Russia

Ketorolac is used for short-term management of moderate to severe pain. It is usually not prescribed for longer than five days, due to its potential to cause kidney damage.

Ketorolac is effective when administered with paracetamol (acetaminophen) to control pain in newborns, because it does not depress respiration as opioids can do. Ketorolac is also an adjuvant to opioid medications and improves pain relief. It can also be used to treat dysmenorrhea as well as idiopathic pericarditis, where it reduces inflammation.

For systemic use, ketorolac can be administered orally, under the tongue, by intramuscular injection, intravenously, and by nasal spray. Usually, it is initially administered by intramuscular injection or intravenously, with oral therapy used as a continuation after the initial IM or IV dose.

Ketorolac is also used as an eye drop. It can be given during eye surgery to help with pain, and is effective in treating ocular itching. There is not enough evidence to decide if non-steroidal anti-inflammatory drugs can help in preventing cystoid macular edema. Ketorolac eye drops have also been used to manage pain from corneal abrasions.

During treatment with ketorolac, clinicians monitor for the manifestation of adverse effects. Lab tests, such as liver function tests, bleeding time, BUN, serum creatinine and electrolyte levels are often used to identify potential complications.

== Contraindications ==
Ketorolac is contraindicated in those with hypersensitivity, allergies to the medication, cross-sensitivity to other NSAIDs, history of peptic ulcer disease, gastrointestinal bleeding, alcohol intolerance, renal impairment, cerebrovascular bleeding, nasal polyps, angioedema, and asthma, and before surgery. It is recommended that patients who have experienced cardiovascular disease, myocardial infarction, stroke, heart failure, coagulation disorders, renal impairment, and hepatic impairment be careful when taking ketorolac.

== Adverse effects ==
A common (>10%) side effect is drowsiness. Infrequent (<1%) side effects include paresthesia, prolonged bleeding time, injection site pain, purpura, sweating, abnormal thinking, increased production of tears, edema, pallor, dry mouth, abnormal taste, urinary frequency, increased liver enzymes, itching and others. Platelet function can be decreased by the use of ketorolac.

Though uncommon, potentially fatal adverse effects include stroke, myocardial infarction, GI bleeding, Stevens–Johnson syndrome, toxic epidermal necrolysis and anaphylaxis. Ketorolac has been assessed to be a relatively higher-risk NSAID when compared to aceclofenac, celecoxib, and ibuprofen.

Like all NSAIDs, ketorolac can cause premature constriction of the ductus arteriosus in the infant if taken by the mother during the third trimester of pregnancy.

In October 2020, the U.S. Food and Drug Administration (FDA) required the prescribing information for all nonsteroidal anti-inflammatory medications to be updated to describe the risk of kidney problems in unborn babies that result in low amniotic fluid. They recommend avoiding NSAIDs in pregnant women at 20 weeks or later in pregnancy.

== Interactions ==
Ketorolac can interact with numerous other medications. Probenecid can increase the probability of having an adverse reaction when taken with ketorolac. Pentoxifylline can increase the risk of bleeding. When aspirin is taken at the same time as ketorolac, the effectiveness is decreased. Problematic GI effects are additive and become more likely if potassium supplements, aspirin, other NSAIDs, corticosteroids, or alcohol is taken at the same time. The effectiveness of antihypertensives and diuretics can be lowered. The use of ketorolac can increase serum lithium levels to the point of toxicity. Toxicity to methotrexate is more likely if ketorolac is taken at the same time. The risk of bleeding increases with the concurrent medications clopidogrel, cefoperazone, valproic acid, cefotetan, eptifibatide, tirofiban, and ticlopidine. Anticoagulants and thrombolytic medications also increase the likelihood of bleeding. Medications used to treat cancer can interact with ketorolac as can radiation therapy. The risk of toxicity to the kidneys increases when ketorolac is taken with cyclosporine.

Ketorolac also interacts with some herbal supplements. For example, the use of Panax ginseng, clove, ginger, arnica, feverfew, dong quai, chamomile, and Ginkgo biloba increases the risk of bleeding.

== Mechanism of action ==
Chemically, ketorolac functions as a carboxylic acid derivative serving non-selectively to block the prostaglandin synthesis by inhibition of prostaglandin G/H synthesis 1 and 2. Prostaglandin functions in the body as a messenger for contraction/relaxation of smooth muscle and modulation of inflammation; inhibition of prostaglandin synthesis thus prevents inflammation. The primary mechanism of action responsible for ketorolac's anti-inflammatory, antipyretic, and analgesic effects is the inhibition of prostaglandin synthesis by competitive blocking of the enzyme cyclooxygenase (COX). Ketorolac is a non-selective COX inhibitor. It is considered a first-generation NSAID, a group of drugs that non-selectively inhibit both COX-1 and COX-2 enzymes, which can lead to gastrointestinal side effects. In contrast, later generations of NSAIDs are designed to selectively inhibit COX-2, aiming to reduce inflammation with fewer gastrointestinal issues.

== History ==
Ketorolac was patented in 1976 and approved for medical use in 1989. It is available as a generic medication. As of 2022, it was the 223rd most commonly prescribed medication in the United States, with more than 1 million prescriptions. In the US, ketorolac is the only widely available intravenous NSAID.

Acular, an ophthalmic formulation (eye-drop), was developed by the Syntex company, of Palo Alto, California around 2006, which is currently licensed by Allergan. The formulation was approved by the FDA in 1992.

Sprix, an intranasal formulation, was approved by the FDA in 2010 for short-term management of moderate to moderately severe pain requiring analgesia at the opioid level.

In 2007, concerns about the high incidence of reported side effects were reported. This led to restrictions on its dosage and maximum duration of use. In the UK, treatment was initiated only in a hospital, although this was not designed to exclude its use in prehospital care and mountain rescue settings. Dosing guidelines were published at that time. Concerns over the high incidence of reported side effects with ketorolac led to its withdrawal (apart from the ophthalmic formulation) in several countries, while in others its permitted dosage and maximum duration of treatment have been reduced. From 1990 to 1993, 97 reactions with fatal outcomes were reported worldwide.

Ketorolac has also been used in collegiate and professional sports and is reported to be routinely used in the National Football League and National Hockey League. Competitive athletes, particularly in contact sports, are often expected by their coaches and teammates to play through injuries, generally with the help of painkillers. However, more recent research has indicated that encouraging players to play while injured tends to result in more severe injuries. A lawsuit alleging widespread league-sanctioned abuse of painkillers was filed by former players against the National Football League in 2017.
