= Glycoprotein IIb/IIIa =

Integrin complex found on platelets

integrin, alpha 2b (platelet glycoprotein IIb of IIb/IIIa complex, antigen CD41)

Identifiers
- Symbol: ITGA2B
- Alt. symbols: GP2B
- NCBI gene: 3674
- HGNC: 6138
- OMIM: 607759
- RefSeq: NM_000419
- UniProt: P08514

Other data
- Locus: Chr. 17 q21.32
Search for
- Structures: Swiss-model
- Domains: InterPro

integrin, beta 3 (platelet glycoprotein IIIa, antigen CD61)

Identifiers
- Symbol: ITGB3
- Alt. symbols: GP3A
- NCBI gene: 3690
- HGNC: 6156
- OMIM: 173470
- RefSeq: NM_000212
- UniProt: P05106

Other data
- Locus: Chr. 17 q21.32
Search for
- Structures: Swiss-model
- Domains: InterPro

In biochemistry and medicine, glycoprotein IIb/IIIa (GPIIb/IIIa, also known as integrin α_{IIb}β_{3}) is an integrin complex found on platelets. It is a transmembrane receptor for fibrinogen and von Willebrand factor, and aids platelet activation. The complex is formed via calcium-dependent association of gpIIb and gpIIIa, a required step in normal platelet aggregation and endothelial adherence. Platelet activation by ADP (blocked by clopidogrel) leads to the aforementioned conformational change in platelet gpIIb/IIIa receptors that induces binding to fibrinogen. The gpIIb/IIIa receptor is a target of several drugs including abciximab, eptifibatide, and tirofiban.

== GPIIb/IIIa complex formation ==
Once platelets are activated, granules secrete clotting mediators, including both ADP and TXA2. These then bind their respective receptors on platelet surfaces, in both an autocrine and paracrine fashion (binds both itself and other platelets). The binding of these receptors result in a cascade of events resulting in an increase in intracellular calcium (e.g. via G_{q} receptor activation leading to Ca^{2+} release from platelet endoplasmic reticulum Ca^{2+} stores, which may activate Protein Kinase C). Hence, this calcium increase triggers the calcium-dependent association of gpIIb and gpIIIa to form the activated membrane receptor complex gpIIb/IIIa, which is capable of binding fibrinogen (factor I), resulting in many platelets "sticking together" as they may connect to the same strands of fibrinogen, resulting in a clot. The coagulation cascade then follows to stabilize the clot, as thrombin (factor IIa) converts the soluble fibrinogen into insoluble fibrin strands. These strands are then cross-linked by factor XIII to form a stabilized blood clot.

== Pathology ==
Defects in glycoprotein IIb/IIIa cause Glanzmann's thrombasthenia.

Autoantibodies against IIb/IIIa can be produced in immune thrombocytopenic purpura.

== Medicine ==
Glycoprotein IIb/IIIa inhibitors like abciximab can be used to prevent blood clots in an effort to decrease the risk of heart attack or stroke.

== See also ==
- Glycoprotein IIb/IIIa inhibitors
