= Phenylephrine/ketorolac =

Combination drug used during eye surgery

Combination of
- Phenylephrine: Alpha-1 adrenergic receptor agonist
- Ketorolac: Nonsteroidal anti-inflammatory

Clinical data
- Trade names: Omidria
- AHFS/Drugs.com: Monograph
- License data: US DailyMed: Phenylephrine_and_ketorolac
- Routes of administration: Intraocular
- ATC code: S01FB51 (WHO)

Legal status
- Legal status: US: ℞-only; EU: Rx-only; In general: ℞ (Prescription only)

Identifiers
- KEGG: D10837

Phenylephrine/ketorolac, sold under the brand name Omidria, is a combination drug used during cataract surgery or intraocular lens replacement to prevent intraoperative miosis and to reduce postoperative pain. It contains phenylephrine and ketorolac.

Phenylephrine/ketorolac was approved for medical use in the United States in May 2014, and in the European Union in July 2015.
