= Barry S. Coller =

Fellow of the New York Academy of Medicine

- Awards: Warren Alpert Foundation Prize (2001)

Academic background
- Education: Columbia University (BA); New York University (MD)

Academic work
- Discipline: hematology
- Institutions: Stony Brook University; Mount Sinai School of Medicine; Rockefeller University

Barry Spencer Coller is an American physician known for his research in platelet physiology and for inventing the Abciximab. He is the David Rockefeller Professor, Physician-In-Chief, and Vice President for Medical Affairs at Rockefeller University.

== Biography ==
Coller grew up in Queens, New York to a family of lawyers and physicians. He graduated from Columbia College, Phi Beta Kappa, in 1966 and his M.D. from New York University School of Medicine in 1970.

He finished his residency at Bellevue Hospital and worked as a clinical associate and staff physician in the hematology division of the National Institutes of Health (NIH). Upon leaving NIH, he joined Stony Brook School of Medicine, becoming Distinguished Service Professor in 1993. His research has focused on investigating the role of blood platelets and the mechanisms of blood cell adhesion in vascular disease and designing new therapies for thrombotic diseases such as stroke and heart attack. He is credited for having developed a monoclonal antibody that inhibits platelet function, which was eventually developed into Abciximab, which, since its approval by the Food and Drug Administration (FDA) in 1994, has been used to treat more than 2 million patients.

Coller joined the faculty of Mount Sinai School of Medicine in 1994 and was Murray M. Rosenberg Professor of Medicine and Chairman of the Samuel Bronfman Department of Medicine until 2001, when he became the university's inaugural David Rockefeller Professor, Physician-in-Chief of Rockefeller University Hospital and Vice President of Rockefeller University for Medical Affairs.

In 2019, Coller was named a member of the advisory panel that examined Duke University's medical research integrity after it was revealed that a Duke employee falsified data to get $112.5 million in NIH and EPA grant between 2006 and 2018.

== Awards and honors ==
He was the recipient of the Robert J. and Claire Pasarow Foundation Medical Research Award in 2004, the Warren Alpert Foundation Prize in 2001, the Karl Landsteiner Memorial Award in 2013, and the George M. Kober Lectureship in 2012. Coller was named to the National Academy of Sciences in 2003, the National Academy of Medicine in 1999, and the American Academy of Arts and Sciences. He was a recipient of the Guggenheim Fellowship in 1982.

== Personal life ==
Coller is married to Bobbi Coller, an art historian and independent curator who is the chairperson of the advisory board of the Pollock-Krasner House and Study Center. The Barry and Bobbi Coller Rare Book Reading Room at the New York Academy of Medicine is named after the couple.
