= AUP1 =

Protein-coding gene in humans

Identifiers
- Aliases: AUP1, ancient ubiquitous protein 1, lipid droplet regulating VLDL assembly factor, AUP1 lipid droplet regulating VLDL assembly factor
- External IDs: OMIM: 602434; MGI: 107789; GeneCards: AUP1
Available structures
PDB	Ortholog search: PDBe RCSB
PDB	List of PDB id codes 2EKF

Gene location (Human)
Chr.	Chromosome 2 (human)
Band	2p13.1	Start	74,526,645 bp
Band	2p13.1	End	74,529,760 bp

Gene location (Mouse)
Chr.	Chromosome 6 (mouse)
Band	6 C3|6 35.94 cM	Start	83,031,502 bp
Band	6 C3|6 35.94 cM	End	83,034,789 bp
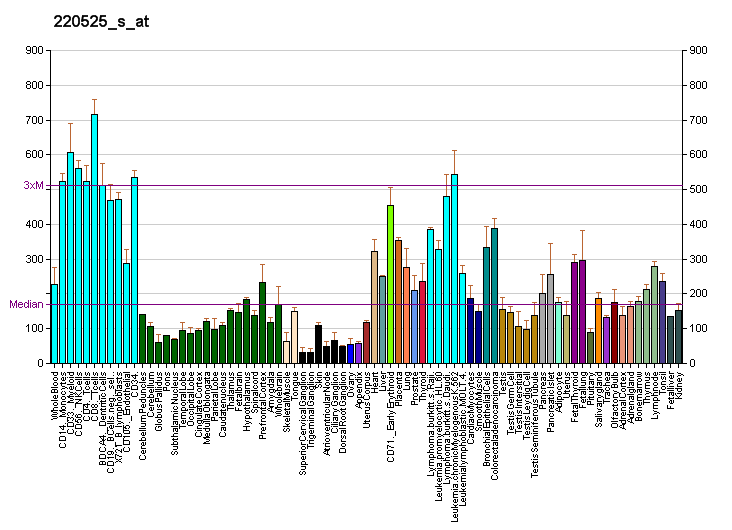
RNA expression pattern
Bgee	Human / Mouse (ortholog); Top expressed in: granulocyte; body of pancreas; mucosa of transverse colon; body of stomach; left lobe of thyroid gland; right lobe of thyroid gland; tendon of biceps brachii; spleen; right lobe of liver; minor salivary glands / Top expressed in: right kidney; granulocyte; muscle of thigh; proximal tubule; choroid plexus of fourth ventricle; yolk sac; neural layer of retina; lip; superior frontal gyrus; primary visual cortex; More reference expression data
BioGPS	More reference expression data
Gene ontology
Molecular function	ubiquitin binding; ubiquitin-protein transferase activator activity; protein binding
Cellular component	extracellular exosome; endoplasmic reticulum membrane; membrane; integral component of endoplasmic reticulum membrane; Hrd1p ubiquitin ligase ERAD-L complex; integral component of membrane; endoplasmic reticulum
Biological process	retrograde protein transport, ER to cytosol; ubiquitin-dependent ERAD pathway; regulation of catalytic activity
Sources:Amigo / QuickGO
Orthologs
Databases	NCBI: entry; OMA: entry
Species	Human	Mouse
Entrez	550	11993
Ensembl	ENSG00000115307	ENSMUSG00000068328
UniProt	Q9Y679	P70295
RefSeq (mRNA)	NM_181575	NM_001025446; NM_001301649; NM_007517
RefSeq (protein)	NP_853553	NP_001288578; NP_031543
Location (UCSC)	Chr 2: 74.53 – 74.53 Mb	Chr 6: 83.03 – 83.03 Mb
PubMed search
- Wikidata
View/Edit Human	View/Edit Mouse

Ancient ubiquitous protein 1 is a protein that in humans is encoded by the AUP1 gene.

== Function ==
This gene encodes a protein that contains a domain with homology to the ancient conserved region of the archain 1 gene and a domain that may be involved in binding ubiquitin-conjugating enzymes. The protein encoded by this gene has been shown to bind to the conserved membrane-proximal sequence of the cytoplasmic tail of integrin alpha (IIb) subunits. These subunits play a crucial role in the integrin alpha (IIb) beta (3) inside-out signalling in platelets and megakaryocytes that leads to platelet aggregation and thrombus formation. This gene overlaps the gene for mitochondrial serine protease 25.

== Interactions ==
AUP1 has been shown to interact with ITGA2B.
