= GISSI =

Italian cardiology research group

The Gruppo Italiano per lo Studio della Sopravvivenza nell'Infarto Miocardico (GISSI) (Italian group for the study of the survival of myocardial infarction) is a cardiology research group founded as a collaboration between two Italian organisations – the Mario Negri Institute for Pharmacological Research and the Associazione Nazionale dei Medici Cardiologi Ospedalieri (ANMCO).

Four large-scale clinical trials (GISSI 1, GISSI 2, GISSI 3, GISSI Prevention) have involved over 60,000 people with acute myocardial infarction (AMI).

== Selected publications ==
- "Effectiveness of intravenous thrombolytic treatment in acute myocardial infarction. Gruppo Italiano per lo Studio della Streptochinasi nell'Infarto Miocardico (GISSI)". Lancet. 1 (8478): 397–402. 1986. doi:10.1016/s0140-6736(86)92368-8. PMID 2868337. S2CID 54241689.
- "Long-term effects of intravenous thrombolysis in acute myocardial infarction: final report of the GISSI study. Gruppo Italiano per lo Studio della Streptochi-nasi nell'Infarto Miocardico (GISSI)". Lancet. 2 (8564): 871–4. 1987. doi:10.1016/s0140-6736(87)91369-9. PMID 2889079.
- "GISSI-2: a factorial randomised trial of alteplase versus streptokinase and heparin versus no heparin among 12,490 patients with acute myocardial infarction. Gruppo Italiano per lo Studio della Sopravvivenza nell'Infarto Miocardico". Lancet. 336 (8707): 65–71. 1990. doi:10.1016/0140-6736(90)91589-3. PMID 1975321. S2CID 54431361.
- The international study group (1990). "In-hospital mortality and clinical course of 20,891 patients with suspected acute myocardial infarction randomised between alteplase and streptokinase with or without heparin. The International Study Group". Lancet. 336 (8707): 71–5. doi:10.1016/0140-6736(90)91590-7. PMID 1975322. S2CID 6756599.
- "GISSI-3: effects of lisinopril and transdermal glyceryl trinitrate singly and together on 6-week mortality and ventricular function after acute myocardial infarction. Gruppo Italiano per lo Studio della Sopravvivenza nell'infarto Miocardico". Lancet. 343 (8906): 1115–22. 1994. doi:10.1016/s0140-6736(94)90232-1. PMID 7910229. S2CID 54310582.
- "Dietary supplementation with n-3 polyunsaturated fatty acids and vitamin E after myocardial infarction: results of the GISSI-Prevenzione trial. Gruppo Italiano per lo Studio della Sopravvivenza nell'Infarto miocardico". Lancet. 354 (9177): 447–55. 1999. doi:10.1016/S0140-6736(99)07072-5. PMID 10465168. S2CID 2649173.
