= TIMI =

The Thrombolysis In Myocardial Infarction (TIMI) Study Group, is an academic research organization (ARO) affiliated with Brigham and Women's Hospital and Harvard Medical School with a focus in the field of cardiovascular disease. The group has its headquarters in Boston, Massachusetts.

The TIMI Study Group was founded by physician Eugene Braunwald in 1984. Braunwald held the chairmanship until 2010, when he appointed Marc Sabatine to the position. Among the group's most important works is the TIMI Risk Score, which assesses the risk of death and ischemic events in patients with unstable angina (UA) or non-ST elevation myocardial infarction (NSTEMI).

== TIMI Risk Score calculators ==
=== TIMI Risk Score for UA/NSTEMI ===
In patients with UA/NSTEMI, the TIMI risk score is a prognostication scheme that categorizes a patient's risk of death and ischemic events and provides a basis for therapeutic decision making.

TIMI Score Calculation (1 point for each):

- Age ≥ 65 years
- Known coronary artery disease (CAD) (stenosis ≥ 50%)
- ≥ 3 risk factors for CAD*
- ASA use in the last 7 days
- Severe angina (≥ 2 episodes w/in 24 hrs)
- ST changes ≥ 0.5mm
- Elevated serum cardiac biomarkers

*Risk factors include: family history of CAD, hypertension, hypercholesterolemia, diabetes, or being a current smoker.

Score interpretation:

% risk at 14 days of: all-cause mortality, new or recurrent MI, or severe recurrent ischemia requiring urgent revascularization.

1 Point	5% risk at 14 days of: all-cause mortality, new or recurrent MI, or severe recurrent ischemia requiring urgent revascularization.
2 Points	8% risk at 14 days of: all-cause mortality, new or recurrent MI, or severe recurrent ischemia requiring urgent revascularization.
3 Points	13% risk at 14 days of: all-cause mortality, new or recurrent MI, or severe recurrent ischemia requiring urgent revascularization.
4 Points	20% risk at 14 days of: all-cause mortality, new or recurrent MI, or severe recurrent ischemia requiring urgent revascularization.
5 Points	26% risk at 14 days of: all-cause mortality, new or recurrent MI, or severe recurrent ischemia requiring urgent revascularization.
6 Points	41% risk at 14 days of: all-cause mortality, new or recurrent MI, or severe recurrent ischemia requiring urgent revascularization.
7 Points	41% risk at 14 days of: all-cause mortality, new or recurrent MI, or severe recurrent ischemia requiring urgent revascularization.

'TIMI risk' estimates mortality following acute coronary syndromes. TIMI risk can be calculated on the TIMI website under "Clinical Calculators."

=== TIMI risk score for STEMI ===
The scoring system is developed for evaluating outcomes of ST-segment elevation myocardial infarction(STEMI) patients. The clinical endpoint is death from any cause within 30 days. The InTIME II database includes 15078 patients with full baseline clinical data available for 14114.

Although this risk score shows strong association with mortality at 30 days, with a >40-fold graded increase in mortality between those with score of 0 and score > 8, there are some study limitations, which may prevent it from application nowadays. First of all, the study excludes history of carebrovascular disease, systolic blood pressure (SBP) > 180 mmHg, diastolic blood pressure > 110 mmHg, cardiogenic shock or increased risk of severe bleeding. Second and maybe the most important one, the risk score is derived and validated among fibrinolytic-eligible patients. Currently, the preferable strategy toward STEMI is immediate angiography +/- primary percutaneous coronary intervention (PPCI). Fibrinolysis is an alternative if timely PPCI not feasible. Third, this model does not incorporate noninvasive and invasive data, such as cardiac biomarkers, ST-segment resolution, left ventricular function and coronary angiography.

TIMI-STEMI Score Calculation

- Age (in years)
  - < 65: +0
  - 65-74: +2
  - >= 75: +3
- SBP < 100 mmHg: +3
- Heart rate > 100: +2
- Killip Class II-IV: +2
- Weight < 67 kg: +1
- History of diabetes mellitus, hypertension or angina: +1
- Anterior ST elevation or left bundle branch block (LBBB): +1
- Time to treatment > 4 hours: +1

Score interpretation:

	mortality at 30 days (%)	mortality at 1 year (%) (among 30-d survivor)
0 Point	0.8	1.0
1 Point	1.6	1.0
2 Points	2.2	1.8
3 Points	4.4	3.0
4 Points	7.3	4.2
5 Points	12.4	6.7
6 Points	16.1	7.7
7 Points	23.4	12.1
8 Points	26.8	16.3
> 8 Points	35.9	17.2
