= Eptifibatide =

Antiplatelet drug

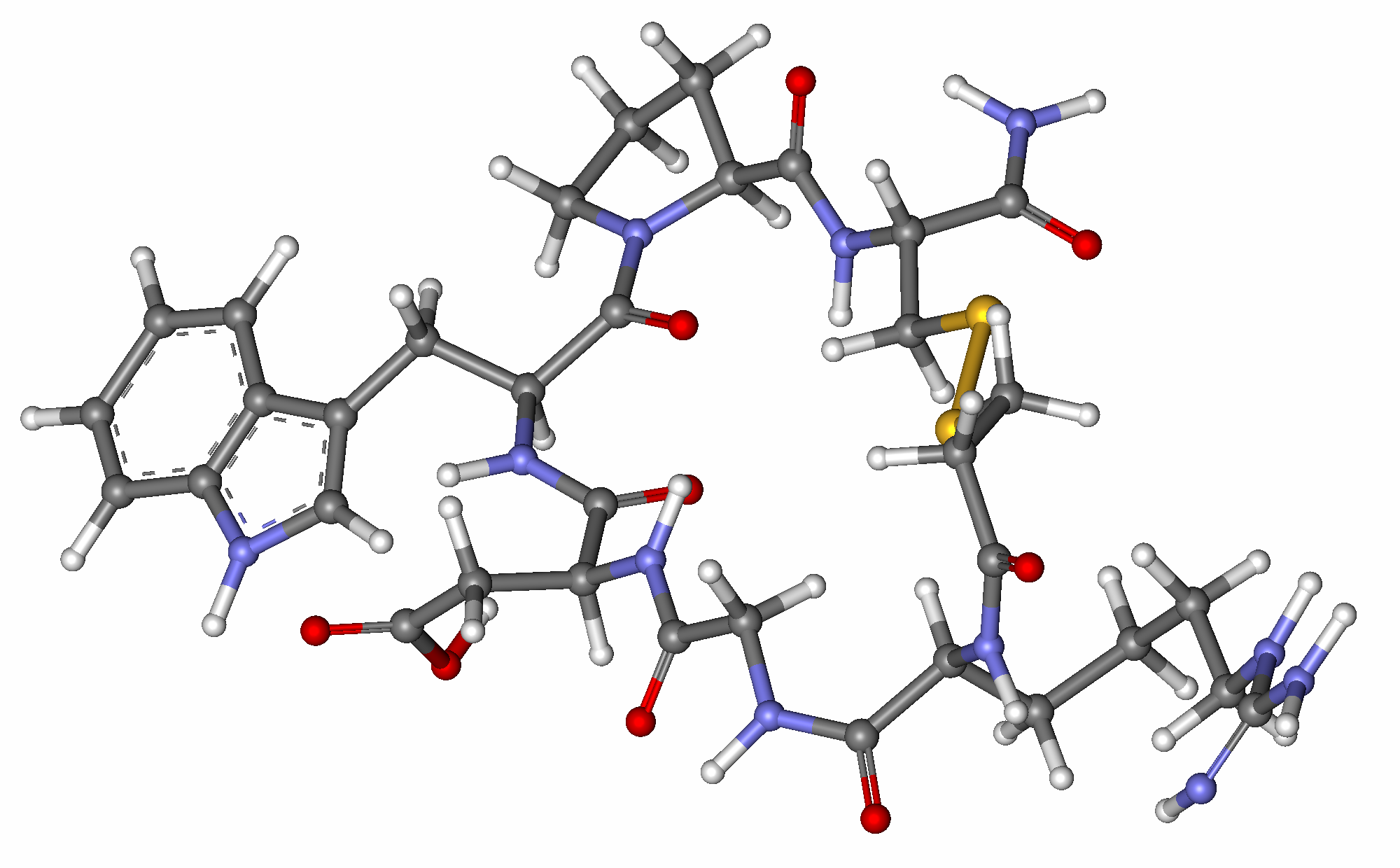

Clinical data
- Trade names: Integrilin
- AHFS/Drugs.com: Monograph
- MedlinePlus: a601210
- License data: EU EMA: by INN; US DailyMed: Eptifibatide; US FDA: Eptifibatide
- Routes of administration: Intravenous
- ATC code: B01AC16 (WHO)

Legal status
- Legal status: AU: S4 (Prescription only); UK: POM (Prescription only); US: ℞-only; EU: Rx-only

Pharmacokinetic data
- Bioavailability: n/a
- Protein binding: ~25%
- Elimination half-life: ~2.5 hours
- Excretion: Kidney

Identifiers
- IUPAC name: N^{6}-(Aminoiminomethyl)-N^{2}-(3-sulfanyl-1-oxopropyl)-L-lysylglycyl-L-α-aspartyl-L-tryptophyl-L-prolyl-L-cysteinamide, cyclic (1→6)disulfide
- CAS Number: 188627-80-7
- PubChem CID: 123610
- IUPHAR/BPS: 6585
- DrugBank: DB00063
- ChemSpider: 10482060
- UNII: NA8320J834
- KEGG: D06888
- ChEBI: CHEBI:291902
- ChEMBL: ChEMBL1174
- CompTox Dashboard (EPA): DTXSID7046673
- ECHA InfoCard: 100.169.160

Chemical and physical data
- Formula: C_{35}H_{49}N_{11}O_{9}S_{2}
- Molar mass: 831.97 g·mol^{−1}
- SMILES: [H][C@@]14CCCN1C(=O)[C@H](Cc2c[nH]c3ccccc23)NC(=O)[C@H](CC(=O)O)NC(=O)CNC(=O)[C@H](CCCCNC(=N)N)NC(=O)CCSSC[C@@H](C(N)=O)NC4=O
- InChI: InChI=1S/C35H49N11O9S2/c36-30(51)25-18-57-56-13-10-27(47)42-22(8-3-4-11-39-35(37)38)31(52)41-17-28(48)43-23(15-29(49)50)32(53)44-24(14-19-16-40-21-7-2-1-6-20(19)21)34(55)46-12-5-9-26(46)33(54)45-25/h1-2,6-7,16,22-26,40H,3-5,8-15,17-18H2,(H2,36,51)(H,41,52)(H,42,47)(H,43,48)(H,44,53)(H,45,54)(H,49,50)(H4,37,38,39)/t22-,23-,24-,25-,26-/m0/s1; Key:CZKPOZZJODAYPZ-LROMGURASA-N

Eptifibatide (Integrilin, Millennium Pharmaceuticals, also co-promoted by Schering-Plough/Essex), is an antiplatelet drug of the glycoprotein IIb/IIIa inhibitor class. Eptifibatide is a cyclic heptapeptide derived from a disintegrin protein (P22827) found in the venom of the southeastern pygmy rattlesnake (Sistrurus miliarius barbouri). It belongs to the class of the arginine-glycine-aspartate-mimetics and reversibly binds to platelets. Eptifibatide has a short half-life. The drug is the third inhibitor of GPIIb/IIIa that has found broad acceptance after the specific antibody abciximab and the non-peptide tirofiban entered the global market.

== Indications ==
Eptifibatide is used to reduce the risk of acute cardiac ischemic events (death and/or myocardial infarction) in patients with unstable angina or non-ST-segment-elevation (e.g., non-Q-wave) myocardial infarction (i.e., non-ST-segment elevation acute coronary syndromes) both in patients who are to receive non surgery (conservative) medical treatment and those undergoing percutaneous coronary intervention (PCI).

The drug is usually applied together with aspirin or clopidogrel and (low molecular weight or unfractionated) heparin. Additionally, the usual supportive treatment consisting of applications of nitrates, beta-blockers, opioid analgesics and/or benzodiazepines should be employed as indicated. Angiographic evaluation and other intensive diagnostic procedures may be considered a first line task before initiating therapy with eptifibatide.

The drug should exclusively be used in hospitalized patients both because of the serious degree of patients' illness and because of the possible side-effects of eptifibatide.

== Contraindications and precautions ==
- Thrombocytopenia : The drug is contraindicated in patients with platelet counts of less than 100,000 per μL because no clinical experience exists regarding such patients.
- Chronic kidney disease : Eptifibatide undergoes kidney elimination. In such patients with chronic kidney disease where a glycoprotein IIb/IIIa inhibitor is likely to provide benefit, Abciximab (trade name: Reopro) is an alternative medication.
- Current bleeding tendencies or abnormally prolonged coagulation parameters observed within 30 days before starting therapy with eptifibatide is intended.
- Coagulation parameters such as ACT, aPTT, TT, and PT should be followed closely during therapy and afterwards.
- Allergy to eptifibatide and/or other ingredients.
- Severe, uncontrolled hypertension.
- Pregnancy : No experience exists. Pregnant patients should be treated only when clearly needed.
- Lactation : No human data exists. Breast-feeding should be avoided during treatment in order to prevent damage to the newborn.
- Geriatric patients : No differences in side effects compared with younger patients have been seen. Nevertheless, geriatric patients should be very closely observed for bleeding and other side-effects.
- Pediatric patients : Eptifibatide is not indicated in patients below 18 years of age, because no experience exists.

== Side effects ==
People receiving eptifibatide are typically seriously ill and most of them are concomitantly treated with other drugs known to have the potential to cause significant side effects. Therefore, not all side effects listed as follows may be attributable to eptifibatide treatment alone:

The major adverse event in the PURSUIT study was severe bleeding. Bleeding occurred as well at sites of clinical intervention (local sites) as at other sites (systemically) like urogenital bleeds. Sometimes, these events were severe enough to require transfusion of blood or plasma concentrates to stop bleeding and counteract anemia. Severe bleeds occurred in 4.4 and 4.7% of patients respectively depending on the infusion rate (0.5 μg/kg/min vs. 0.75 μg/kg/min). A few cases of death due to severe bleeding events attributable to drug therapy were reported. No cases of hemorrhagic stroke were seen. Thrombocytopenia of unknown origin (allergic reaction?) was also noticed in 0.2% of patients.

Additionally, hypotension was seen frequently (6%). Cardiovascular failure was also frequent (2%) as were serious arrhythmias (ventricular fibrillation 1.5%, atrial fibrillation 6%). Severe allergic (anaphylactic) reactions occurred in almost 0.2% of patients. These reactions can be life-threatening and may be due to the peptide character of eptifibatide. Other side effects were rare and mild in nature and may not be connected to eptifibatide therapy.

== Study results ==
Eptifibatide was licensed due to the positive results of the so-called PURSUIT study encompassing 10,948 patients. In this study all patients had experienced either unstable angina or a non-ST-segment-elevation myocardial infarction. Significantly fewer patients developed a myocardial infarction under therapy with eptifibatide. Death rates showed a tendency in favor of eptifibatide, but this superiority was not statistically significant.

== Additional information ==
Sometimes the treating physicians require the patient after discharge from hospital to continue treatment with aspirin or clopidogrel for a few weeks, some months or even for life (as usually is the case with aspirin) to prevent recurrence of symptoms, development of myocardial infarction and/or death related to cardiovascular disease. This advice should be strictly followed. Eptifibatide is one of very many antiplatelet drugs that all have different consequences on the platelet's activity. Eptifibatide has been shown to have salutary effects for patients with Covid related thrombosis.

== Inventors ==
Eptifibatide was discovered by a team led by Robert M. Scarborough and David Phillips, at COR Therapeutics which was acquired by Millennium Pharmaceuticals in 2001.

== See also ==
- Glycoprotein IIb/IIIa inhibitors
