= Integrin alpha 2b =

Mammalian protein found in Homo sapiens

ITGA2B
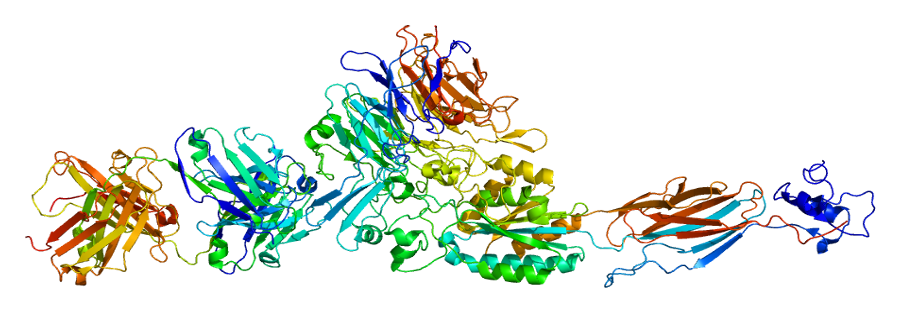

Identifiers
- Aliases: ITGA2B, BDPLT16, BDPLT2, CD41, CD41B, GP2B, GPIIb, GT, GTA, HPA3, PPP1R93, integrin subunit alpha 2b, GT1
- External IDs: OMIM: 607759; MGI: 96601; GeneCards: ITGA2B
Available structures
PDB	Ortholog search: PDBe RCSB
PDB	List of PDB id codes 1DPK, 1DPQ, 1KUP, 1KUZ, 1M8O, 1S4W, 1TYE, 2K1A, 2K9J, 2KNC, 2MTP, 2VC2, 2VDK, 2VDL, 2VDM, 2VDN, 2VDO, 2VDP, 2VDQ, 2VDR, 3FCS, 3FCU, 3NID, 3NIF, 3NIG, 3T3M, 3T3P, 3ZDX, 3ZDY, 3ZDZ, 3ZE0, 3ZE1, 3ZE2, 4CAK, 4Z7O, 4Z7Q, 5HDB, 4Z7N

Gene location (Human)
Chr.	Chromosome 17 (human)
Band	17q21.31	Start	44,372,180 bp
Band	17q21.31	End	44,389,649 bp

Gene location (Mouse)
Chr.	Chromosome 11 (mouse)
Band	11 D|11 66.29 cM	Start	102,344,123 bp
Band	11 D|11 66.29 cM	End	102,360,948 bp
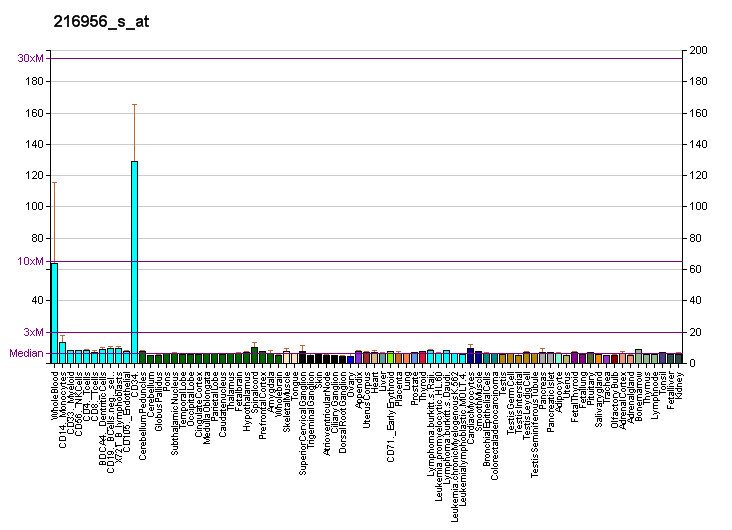

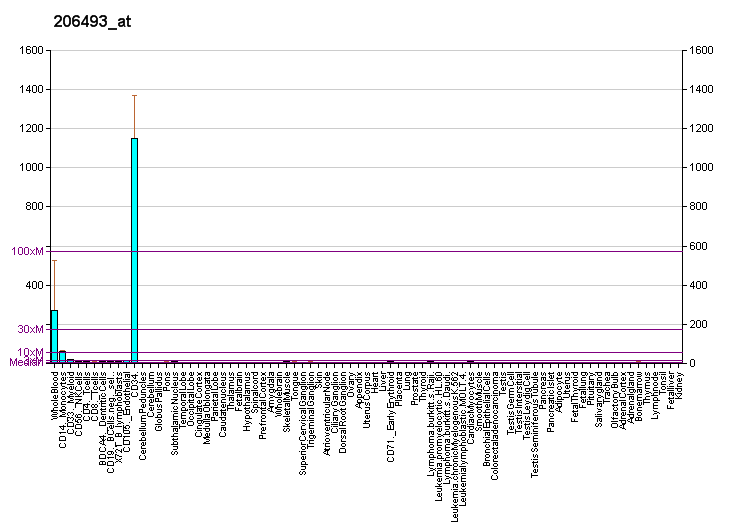

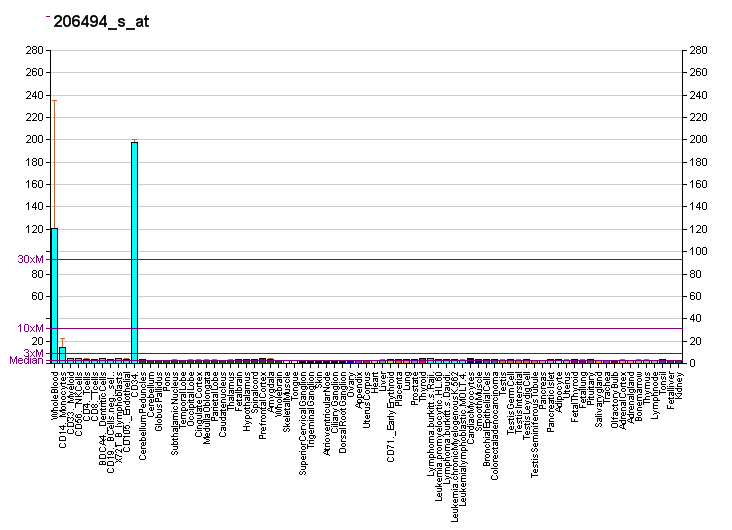
RNA expression pattern
Bgee	Human / Mouse (ortholog); Top expressed in: monocyte; blood; trabecular bone; granulocyte; pancreatic ductal cell; gonad; testicle; right hemisphere of cerebellum; bone marrow cell; sperm / Top expressed in: blood; tibiofemoral joint; embryo; yolk sac; spleen; lip; body of femur; right kidney; gastrula; granulocyte; More reference expression data
BioGPS	More reference expression data
Gene ontology
Molecular function	protein binding; fibrinogen binding; extracellular matrix binding; identical protein binding; metal ion binding
Cellular component	focal adhesion; integrin complex; integral component of plasma membrane; platelet alpha granule membrane; integral component of membrane; membrane; external side of plasma membrane; extracellular exosome; plasma membrane; blood microparticle; cell surface
Biological process	extracellular matrix organization; cell-matrix adhesion; positive regulation of leukocyte migration; platelet aggregation; platelet degranulation; cell adhesion; integrin-mediated signaling pathway; regulation of megakaryocyte differentiation
Sources:Amigo / QuickGO
Orthologs
Databases	NCBI: entry; OMA: entry
Species	Human	Mouse
Entrez	3674	16399
Ensembl	ENSG00000005961	ENSMUSG00000034664
UniProt	P08514	Q9QUM0
RefSeq (mRNA)	NM_000419	NM_010575
RefSeq (protein)	NP_000410	NP_034705
Location (UCSC)	Chr 17: 44.37 – 44.39 Mb	Chr 11: 102.34 – 102.36 Mb
PubMed search
- Wikidata
View/Edit Human	View/Edit Mouse

Integrin alpha-IIb is a protein that in humans is encoded by the ITGA2B gene. ITGA2B, also known as CD41, encodes integrin alpha chain 2b. Integrins are heterodimeric integral membrane proteins composed of an alpha chain and a beta chain. Alpha chain 2b undergoes post-translational cleavage to yield disulfide-linked light and heavy chains that join with beta 3 to form a fibrinogen receptor expressed in platelets that plays a crucial role in coagulation. Mutations that interfere with this role result in thrombasthenia. At least 38 disease-causing mutations in this gene have been discovered. In addition to adhesion, integrins are known to participate in cell-surface mediated signalling.

== Interactions ==
ITGA2B has been shown to interact with AUP1 and CLNS1A.

== See also ==
- Cluster of differentiation
- Glycoprotein IIb/IIIa
