= Glycoprotein IIb/IIIa inhibitors =

Class of antiplatelet drugs

In medicine, glycoprotein IIb/IIIa inhibitors, also GpIIb/IIIa inhibitors, is a class of antiplatelet agents.

Several GpIIb/IIIa inhibitors exist:

- abciximab (abcixifiban) (ReoPro)
- eptifibatide (Integrilin)
- tirofiban (Aggrastat)
- roxifiban
- orbofiban

== Use ==
Glycoprotein IIb/IIIa inhibitors are frequently used during percutaneous coronary intervention (PCI) (angioplasty with or without intracoronary stent placement). Their benefit comes from preventing thrombosis, when typically clear blood vessels are blocked by blood clot formation. Preventing platelet adhesion and thus, preventing thrombus formation through inhibition of the GpIIb/IIIa receptor on the surface of individual platelets. They have also assisted with other blood-clot-related treatment procedures outside of the heart.

Glycoprotein IIb/IIIa inhibitors may also be used to treat acute coronary syndromes (ACS), without percutaneous coronary intervention, depending on Thrombolysis In Myocardial Infarction (TIMI) risk. The inhibitors can also be used to treat another type of ACS, called non-ST-segment elevation acute coronary syndrome (NSTE ACS).

== History ==
Glycoprotein IIb/IIIa inhibitors development arose from the understanding of Glanzmann's thrombasthenia, a condition in which the GpIIb/IIIa receptor is deficient or dysfunctional. The dysfunction in the receptor impairs the ability to form blood clots in wound repair (hemostasis), causing chronic bleeding, especially in the soft tissue membranes that line body cavities. Sample platelets from these patients exhibited a similar, but abnormal, glycoprotein pattern, which, along with a patient's body developing an antibody, lead scientist to explore targeting the receptor as a treatment option for patients.

Aspirin had been used to inhibit platelet formation, but in the 1980s, scientists created an antibody Fab fragment that performed better. Abciximab, a monoclonal antibody, was then clinically approved to reduce blood clot formation during PCI to help the procedure go more smoothly. Over the next ten years, improvements were made to develop other glycoprotein inhibitors, such as eptifibatide and tirofiban, by shortening their half-lives to make them more suitable for treatments.

== Molecular mechanisms ==
The glycoprotein IIb/IIIa cellular receptor ultimately facilitates the joining of individual platelets to form clots by attaching and chaining together adhesive ligands. The receptor's structure contains two different parts: an αIIb-subunit, which is important for binding signal molecules of manganese and calcium, and a β3-subunit.

== Treatment effectiveness ==
The use of glycoprotein IIb/IIIa inhibitors to treat NSTE-ACS in a coronary catheterization procedure is associated with improving blood flow, which reduces damage to tissues and frequency of strokes/heart attacks by maintaining oxygen availability to these structures. However, due to the inhibition of platelet formation, there is an increased risk of bleeding.
