= Killip class =

Medical classification system

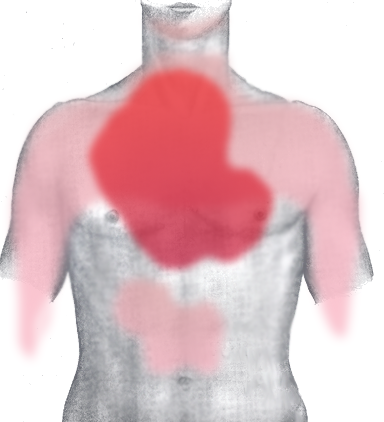
Pain in acute myocardial infarction

The Killip classification is a system used in individuals with an acute myocardial infarction (heart attack), taking into account physical examination and the development of heart failure in order to predict and stratify their risk of mortality. Individuals with a low Killip class are less likely to die within the first 30 days after their myocardial infarction than individuals with a high Killip class.

== The study ==
The study was a case series with unblinded, unobjective outcomes, not adjusted for confounding factors, nor validated in an independent set of patients. The setting was the coronary care unit of a university hospital in the USA.

250 patients were included in the study (aged 28 to 94; mean 64, 72% male) with a myocardial infarction. Patients with a cardiac arrest prior to admission were excluded.

Patients were ranked by Killip class in the following way:

- Killip class I includes individuals with no clinical signs of heart failure.
- Killip class II includes individuals with rales or crackles in the lungs, an S_{3}, and elevated jugular venous pressure.
- Killip class III describes individuals with frank acute pulmonary edema.
- Killip class IV describes individuals in cardiogenic shock or hypotension (measured as systolic blood pressure lower than 90 mmHg), and evidence of peripheral vasoconstriction (oliguria, cyanosis or sweating).

== Conclusions ==
The numbers below were accurate in 1967. Nowadays, they have diminished by 30 to 50% in every class.

Within a 95% confidence interval the patient outcome was as follows:

Killip class I:	81/250 patients;	32% (27–38%).	Mortality rate was found to be 6%.(current 30-day mortality 2.8)
Killip class II:	96/250 patients;	38% (32–44%).	Mortality rate was found to be 17%.(current 30-day mortality 8.8)
Killip class III:	26/250 patients;	10% (6.6–14%).	Mortality rate was found to be 38%.(current 30-day mortality 14.4)
Killip class IV:	47/250 patients;	19% (14–24%).	Mortality rate was found to be 81%.

The Killip-Kimball classification has played a fundamental role in classic cardiology, having been used as a stratifying criterion for many other studies. Worsening Killip class has been found to be independently associated with increasing mortality in several studies.

Killip class 1 and no evidence of hypotension or bradycardia, in patients presenting with acute coronary syndrome, should be considered for immediate IV beta blockade.
