= Tirofiban =

Antiplatelet drug

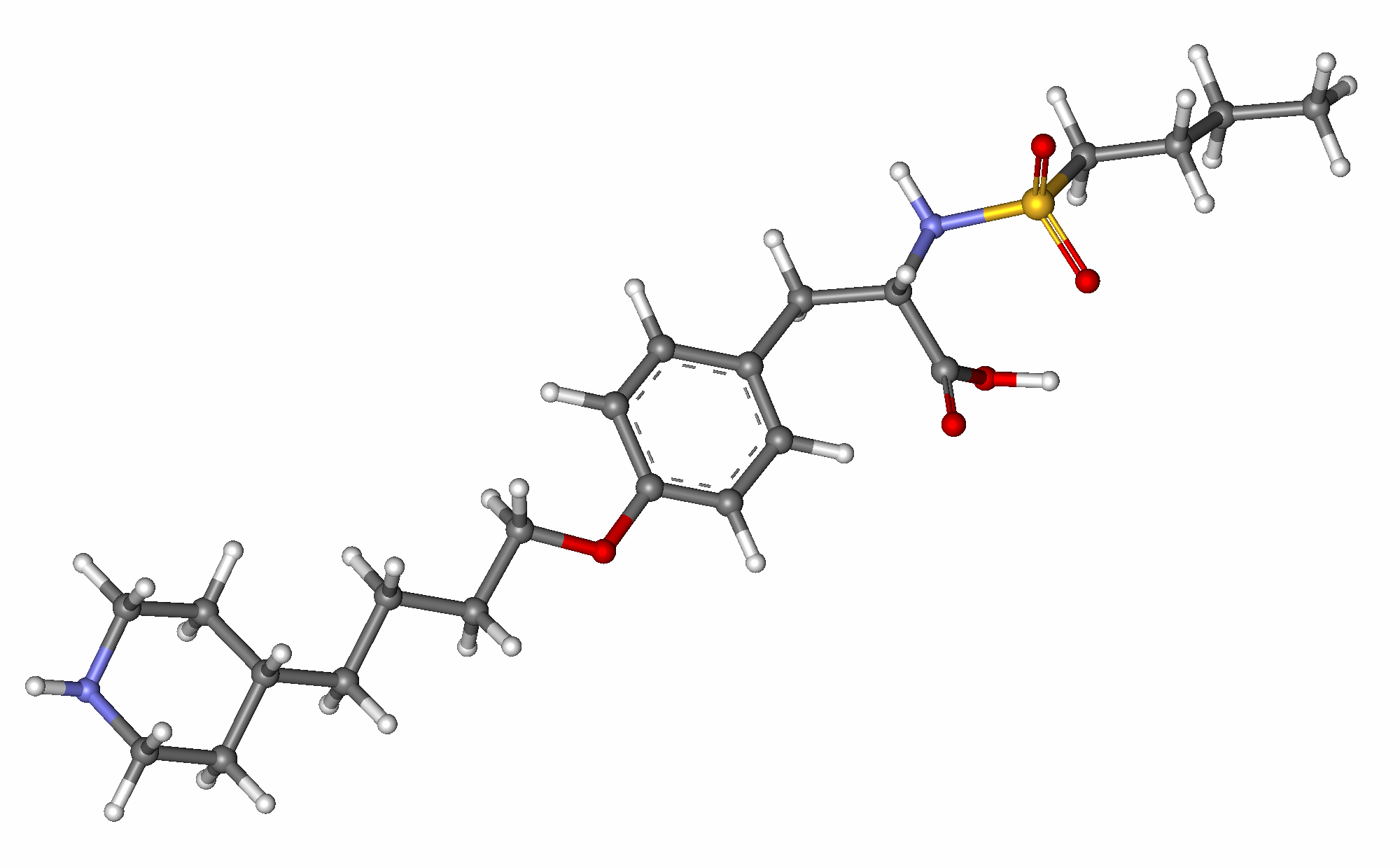

Clinical data
- Trade names: Aggrastat
- AHFS/Drugs.com: Monograph
- MedlinePlus: a601210
- License data: US DailyMed: Tirofiban
- Pregnancy category: AU: B1
- Routes of administration: intravenous
- ATC code: B01AC17 (WHO)

Legal status
- Legal status: US: ℞-only; In general: ℞ (Prescription only)

Pharmacokinetic data
- Protein binding: 65%
- Elimination half-life: 2 hours

Identifiers
- IUPAC name: (2S)-2-[(butylsulfonyl)amino]-3-{4-[4-(piperidin-4-yl)butoxy]phenyl}propanoic acid
- CAS Number: 144494-65-5
- PubChem CID: 60947
- IUPHAR/BPS: 6586
- DrugBank: DB00775
- ChemSpider: 54912
- UNII: GGX234SI5H
- KEGG: D08607
- ChEBI: CHEBI:9605
- ChEMBL: ChEMBL916
- CompTox Dashboard (EPA): DTXSID20162730
- ECHA InfoCard: 100.163.548

Chemical and physical data
- Formula: C_{22}H_{36}N_{2}O_{5}S
- Molar mass: 440.60 g·mol^{−1}
- 3D model (JSmol): Interactive image
- SMILES: O=S(=O)(N[C@H](C(=O)O)Cc2ccc(OCCCCC1CCNCC1)cc2)CCCC
- InChI: InChI=1S/C22H36N2O5S/c1-2-3-16-30(27,28)24-21(22(25)26)17-19-7-9-20(10-8-19)29-15-5-4-6-18-11-13-23-14-12-18/h7-10,18,21,23-24H,2-6,11-17H2,1H3,(H,25,26)/t21-/m0/s1; Key:COKMIXFXJJXBQG-NRFANRHFSA-N

Tirofiban, sold under the brand name Aggrastat, is an antiplatelet medication. It belongs to a class of antiplatelets named glycoprotein IIb/IIIa inhibitors. Tirofiban is a small molecule inhibitor of the protein-protein interaction between fibrinogen and the platelet integrin receptor GP IIb/IIIa and is the first drug candidate whose origins can be traced to a pharmacophore-based virtual screening lead.

It is available as a generic medication.

== Medical uses ==
Tirofiban is indicated to reduce the rate of thrombotic cardiovascular events (combined endpoint of death, myocardial infarction, or refractory ischemia/repeat cardiac procedure) in people with non-ST elevation acute coronary syndrome.

== Contraindications and precautions ==
Tirofiban is contraindicated in patients with:

- Known hypersensitivity to any component of tirofiban.
- History of thrombocytopenia with prior exposure to tirofiban.
- Active internal bleeding, or history of bleeding diathesis, major surgical procedure or severe physical trauma within the previous month.

== Adverse reactions ==
Bleeding is the most commonly reported adverse reaction.

=== Use in pregnancy ===
Tirofiban has been demonstrated to cross the placenta in pregnant rats and rabbits. Although the doses employed in these studies were a multiple of those used in human beings. no adverse effects on the offspring in both animals have been seen. However, there are no adequate and well controlled studies in pregnant women. Therefore, tirofiban should be used during pregnancy only if clearly indicated.

Nursing mothers: It is not known whether tirofiban is excreted in human milk. However, significant levels of tirofiban are excreted in rat milk. Therefore, nursing should be discontinued during the period of drug administration and the milk discarded. Nursing may resume 24 hours after cessation of treatment with tirofiban.

=== Pediatric use ===
Safety and effectiveness in children have not been established.

=== Other precautions and laboratory exams ===
The activated partial thromboplastin time is the most reliable coagulation parameter and should be obtained regularly during treatment, particular if a bleeding episode occurs that may be associated with tirofiban therapy. Other important hematological parameters are platelet count, clotting time, hematocrit and hemoglobin. Proper technique regarding artery site access for sheath placement and removal of sheath should be followed. Arterial sheaths should be removed when the patient's activated clotting time is < 180 seconds or 2 to 6 hours following withdrawal of heparin.

== Side effects ==
The following side effects were noted under treatment with tirofiban and heparin (and aspirin, if tolerated). Other drugs were used as necessary.

The major adverse effect is bleeding on local sites of clinical intervention and systemically (regarding parts of the body or the whole body system). Major bleeding has occurred in 1.4% of patients and minor bleeding in 10.5%. Transfusions were required to terminate bleeding and to improve bleeding-related anemia in 4.0% of all patients. Geriatric patients have experienced more bleeding episodes than younger, women more than men.

Thrombocytopenia was more often seen in the tirofiban + heparin group (1.5%) than in the heparin control group (0.8%). This adverse effect was usually readily reversible within days.

Positive fecal and urine hemoglobin tests have also been reported.

Post-marketing events have been the occurrence of intracranial bleeding, retroperitoneal bleeding, pulmonary hemorrhage and spinal-epidural hematoma. Fatal bleeding have been reported rarely.

Sometimes, thrombocytopenia was associated with chills, low-grade fever or bleeding complications (see above).

Cases of hypersensitivity including anaphylaxis have occurred.

== Interactions ==
The concomitant application of warfarin or other oral anticoagulants may increase the risk of serious bleeding events. The decision whether maintenance therapy with these drugs should be discontinued during tirofiban treatment has to be made by the responsible clinician.

== Pharmacology ==
Tirofiban has a rapid onset and short duration of action after proper IV administration. Coagulation parameters turn to normal 4 to 8 hours after the drug is withdrawn.

== Chemistry ==
Tirofiban is a synthetic, non-peptide inhibitor of the interaction of fibrinogen with the integrin glycoprotein IIb/IIIa on human platelets. The Merck chemistry team of George Hartman, Melissa Egbertson and Wasyl Halczenko developed tirofiban from a lead compound discovered in focused screening of small molecule replacements of the key arginine-glycine-aspartic acid (Arg-Gly-Asp) subunit of fibrinogen. Computation of the distance between the charged Arg and Asp sites in fibrinogen provided guidance leading to directed screening success. Tirofiban constitutes an antithrombotic, specifically an inhibitor of platelet aggregation.

Tirofiban is a modified version of a molecule found in the venom of the saw-scaled viper Echis carinatus.

== History ==
The drug is marketed under the brand name Aggrastat in the US by Medicure Pharma, in China by Eddingpharm, and in the rest of the world by Correvio International Sàrl.

According to the US Orange Book, it was first approved in the US on 20 April 2000. Patent numbers 5733919; 5965581 and 5972967 all expired in October 2016. Patent 5978698 expired in October 2017. Patent 6136794 expired in January 2019. Patent 6770660 expires in June 2023.
