= Draculin =

Glycoprotein found in the saliva of vampire bats

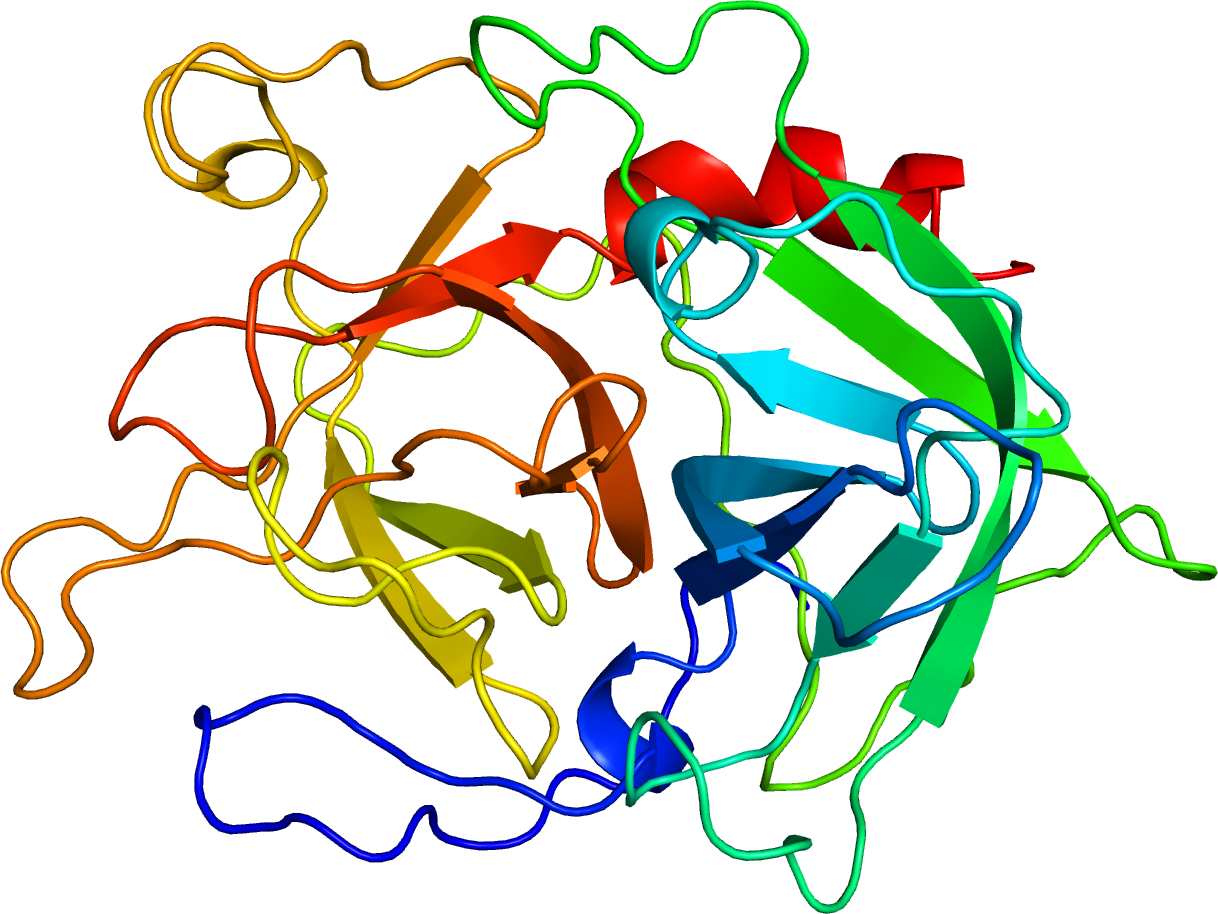

Identifiers
- Organism: Desmodus rotundus
- Symbol: LTF
- Entrez: 112309586
- Orthologs: NCBI: entry; OMA: entry
- UniProt: K9IMD0

Other data
- Chromosome: Unplaced: 29.75 - 29.79 Mb
Search for
- Structures: Swiss-model
- Domains: InterPro

Draculin (named after Count Dracula) is a glycoprotein found in the saliva of vampire bats, Desmodus rotundus. It is a member of the lactotransferrin protein family. It is a single-chain polypeptide protein composed of 708 amino acids, weighing about 88.5 kDa when reduced and 83 kDa when non-reduced, and selectively inhibits FIXa and FXa. It functions as an anticoagulant, inhibiting coagulation factors IX (IXa) and X (Xa) by establishing rapid equilibrium with factor Xa, and is the first natural polypeptide which has been described to show immediate anti-IXa and anti-Xa properties. The rapid equilibrium achieved at comparable concentrations of FXa and Draculin, as well as the lack of any detectable lag phases in assays, supports the conclusion that Draculin is a tight-binding inhibitor. In addition, Draculin inhibits the conversion of prothrombin to thrombin, preventing fibrinogen from converting to fibrin. These two processes inhibit blood coagulation thus keeping the blood of the bitten victim from clotting while the bat is drinking. The activation of factor X is a common point between the intrinsic and extrinsic pathway of blood coagulation.

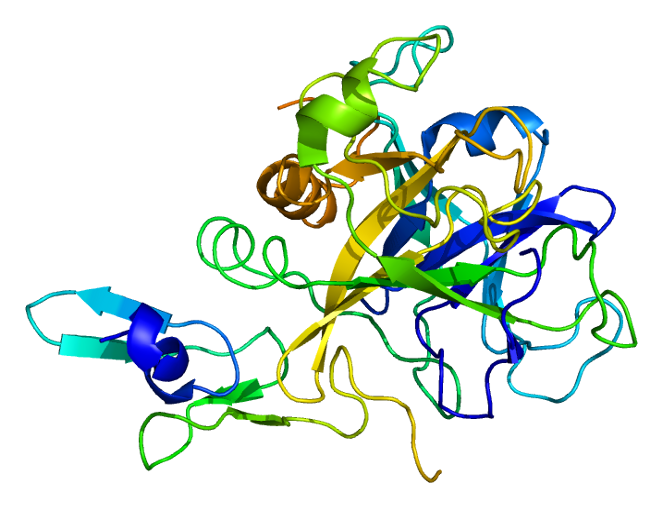
Factor X

Activated factor X (FXa) is the sole enzyme that catalyzes the conversion of prothrombine into thrombin, which is vital in the coagulation cascade. Draculin is a member of the Lactoferrin family of proteins that functions as an antibacterial protein in other mammals, but has been co-opted in bat evolution to function as an anticoagulant.

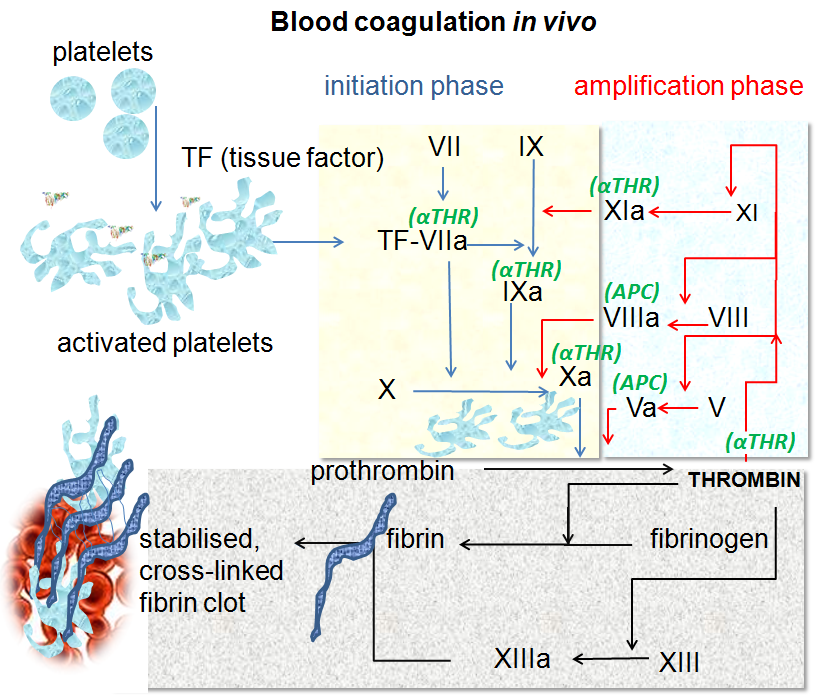
Blood Coagulation

Draculin is a noncompetitive, tight-binding inhibitor of FXa. The inhibition upon contact with the blood of the victim is immediate. Draculin forms equimolar complexes with factor FXa. The formation of Draculin-factor Xa is a two-stage process. The first reversible stage is characterized by the following constants: k1 = 1.117*106 M-1*sec-1, k-1 = 15.388*10-1 sec-1. The second irreversible (concentration-independent) stage is characterized by the forward reaction rate constant k2 = 0.072 sec-1. The dissociation constant is determined as the ratio k-1/k1 = 13.76 nM. Because of the immediate inhibition, the reaction is not readily reversible initially, but is a reversible reaction. It does not act on thrombin, trypsin or chymotrypsin and does not express fibrinolytic activity. The protein increases the lag phase as well as the height of the peak of thrombin generation when in plasma, leading to prolonged bleeding. The biological activity of Draculin is highly dependent on glycosylation of the native protein and can be severely affected by the salivation pattern of the animals.

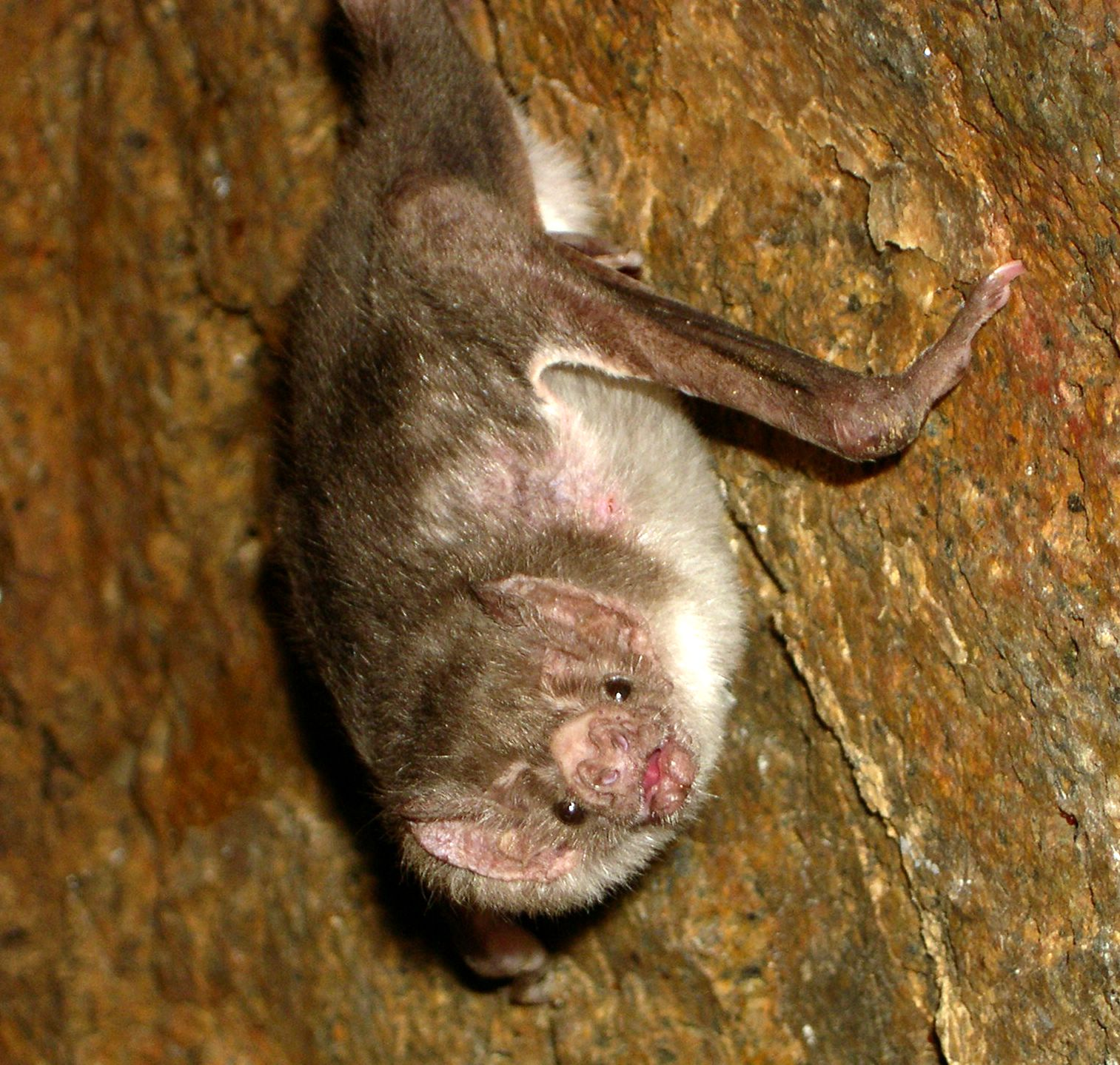
Vampire Bat

Daily salivation of vampire bats yields a saliva that progressively decreases in anticoagulant activity. However, there is no significant change in overall protein content during this time. After a 4-day period of rest, anticoagulant activity of the saliva is restored. In addition, purified native Draculin, obtained from high- and low-activity saliva, shows significant differences in composition of the carbohydrate moiety, and glycosylation pattern. Furthermore, controlled chemical de-glycosylation of native Draculin progressively leads to complete loss of the biological activity, despite the conditions leaving the polypeptide backbone intact. These results suggest that oligosaccharides linked to Draculin are essential for it to express against FXa. In addition, it suggests that Draculin is actually secreted as a mixture of glycoforms. The final anticoagulant activity of Draculin then, in turn, relies on correct glycosylation, implying that glycosylation is the limiting step for production of Draculin with optimal anticoagulant properties. In this regard, the appropriate glycosylation of Draculin may be in part responsible for the dual, independent, inhibitory action of native Draculin on FIXa and FXa, suggesting a novel mechanism of inhibition which is different from other known natural inhibitors of FXa.

== Structure ==
Draculin is a single-chain protein composed of 708 amino acids, weighing about 83 kDa with a pI of 4.1-4.2. When reduced, the gel electrophoresis data indicates a slightly higher molecular mass suggesting intra-chain disulphide bonds.

There are two different structural forms of Draculin. However, the two forms do not significantly differ from the other. Both structures are able to and do bind to coagulation factors IXa and Xa. The main difference is evident in inhibition activity. One structural form will inhibit factor IXa and the other Xa. The inhibitory activity of one factor is not affected by the presence of the other. FXa-Draculin complex is a two-step mechanism that, through experimental conditions, is irreversible.

== Anti-Xa Peptides ==
In addition to Draculin, several other naturally occurring anti-Xa polypeptides function as physiological serine-protease inhibitors, including Antistasin from the leech Haementeria officinalis, the tick anticoagulant peptide (TAP) from Ornithodoros moubata, Ecotin from E. coli, and the anticoagulant peptide AcAP. These peptides act as reversible slow, tight-binding inhibitors; however, Antistasin and Ecotin are cleaved by FXa while TAP remains unaffected by the protease. Draculin's noncompetitive inhibition prevents cleavage by the protease FXa, enabling the toxin to preserve anticoagulation and prevent clot formation while the bat feeds and digests. Compared to the other anti-Xa polypeptides, such as Antistasin, Ecotin, rTAP, and AcAP, Draculin has significant larger kinetic parameters of K_{i}=13.76-14.80 x 10-9 M (K_{d}), K_{on}=1.117 x 106 (M^{-1} s _{-1}), and K_{off}=15.833 x 10-3(s^{-1)}. Draculin's significant larger K_{off} supports the conclusion of Draculin being a weaker inhibitor.

== Expression of Draculin ==
As a naturally occurring anticoagulant, research into Draculin promises therapeutic strategy into new anticoagulants and provides a foundation for deeper investigations into FXa related coagulation mechanisms. Since the first step of the Draculin-FXa mechanism is driven by concentration and the second step is concentration independent, the FXa-Draculin complex behaves as irreversible under experimental conditions. Glycosylation is a common post-translational modification in which carbohydrates (glycans) are added to proteins or lipids. The resulting glycoproteins and glycolipids acquire altered physical and biochemical properties. As a glycoprotein, Draculin requires a specific glycosylation profile to express its maximum inhibitory activity. Its attached oligosaccharides are essential FXa inhibition, as demonstrated by the loss of anti-Xa activity following incubation with the lectins WGA and PNA.

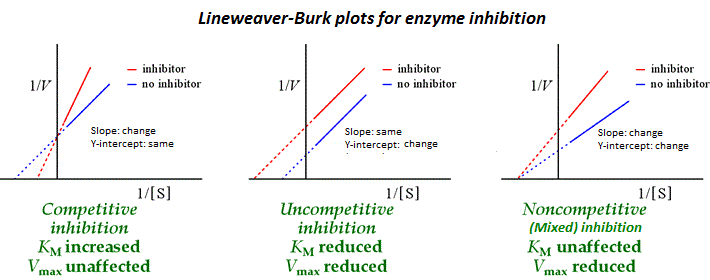
Example of Noncompetitive inhibition

P-aminobenzamidine (pAB) is used as fluorescent probe that reports on the active site accessibility in serine proteases, showing increased fluorescence upon binding. Scientists have found that Draculin does not interfere with pAB-FXa binding; however, at concentrations that inhibit FXa, Draculin has been shown to reduce the fluorescence of the pAB-FXa complex by 14%. This observation, and the Lineweaver-Burk pattern, supports Draculin's noncompetitive inhibitory mechanism and suggests that additional Draculin-FXa-[S] complexes can form under these conditions.

== Evolution ==
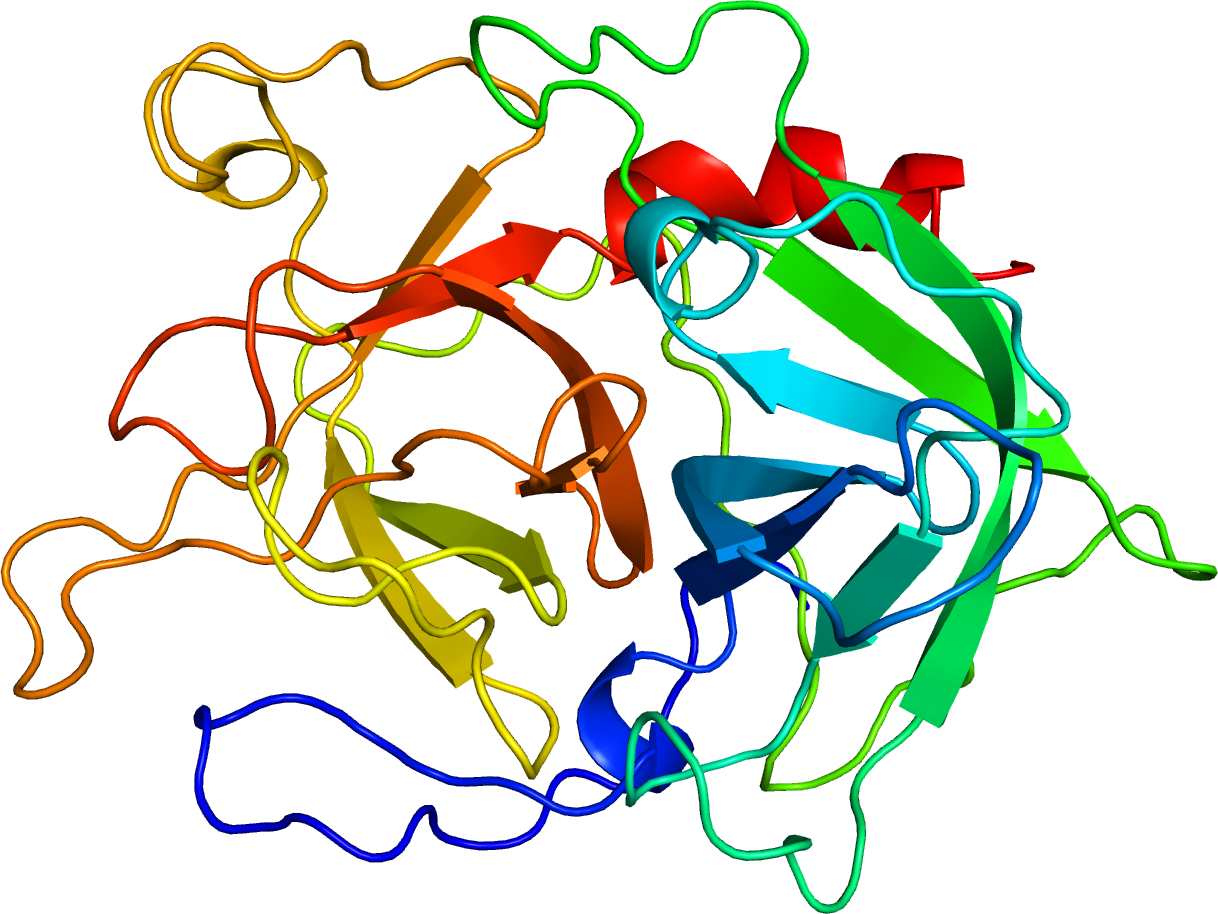
Desmoteplase structure, found in vampire bat venom

The molecular evolution of vampire bat venom highlights the dominant contributions of Draculin and DSPA to its anticoagulant and proteolytic functions. Transcriptomic and proteomic data from the submaxillary glands of Desmodus rotundus show active expression of Draculin at both the RNA level and the corresponding protein production level. Venom secretion, containing Draculin and the desmoteplase salivary plasminogen activator DSPA, enables vampire bats to sustain a hawmatophagous lifestyle by disrupting the prey's normal physiological and biochemical responses during feeding.

Vampire bats frequently revisit the same host for repeated feedings, and typically relick the wound for approximately 30 minutes per fe feeding, prolonging exposure of host tissues to salivary components. The parasitic nature of vampire bat feeding, coupled with the extensive application of saliva to the wound and the antigenic properties of the anticoagulants, can trigger an acquired immune response in the bat's prey. Although prey animals have been known to develop acquired immunological resistance to Draculin over prolonged exposure, the frequent site-directed or focul [sic?] mutagenesis with the venom limits the rapid evolution of such resistance.

== See also ==
- Desmoteplase
- Antistasin
- Tick Anticoagulant Peptide (TAP)
- Ecotin
- P-aminobenzamidine (pAB)
- Factor X (FXa)
- Vampire Bats
- Glycosylation
- WGA
- PNA
- antigenic properties
- immune response
- mutagenesis
- Ornithodoros moubata
- Haementeria officinalis
- E. coli
