= Ecotin =

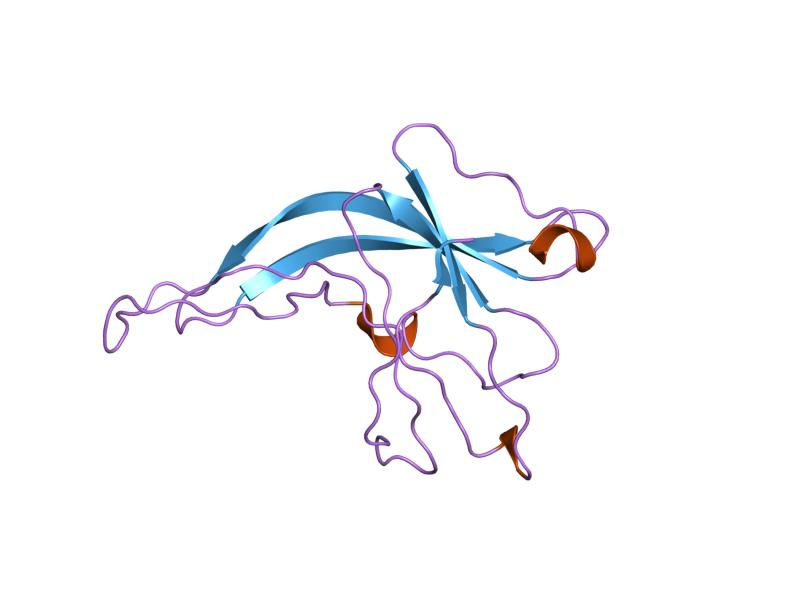
- crystal structure of a monomeric form of general protease inhibitor, ecotin in absence of a protease

Identifiers
- Symbol: Ecotin
- Pfam: PF03974
- InterPro: IPR005658
- SCOP2: 1slu / SCOPe / SUPFAM
Available protein structures:
- PDB: IPR005658 PF03974 (ECOD; PDBsum)
- AlphaFold: IPR005658; PF03974

In molecular biology, ecotin is a protease inhibitor which belongs to MEROPS inhibitor family I11, clan IN. Ecotins are dimeric periplasmic proteins from Escherichia coli and related Gram-negative bacteria that have been shown to be potent inhibitors of many trypsin-fold serine proteases of widely varying substrate specificity, which belong to MEROPS peptidase family S1. Phylogenetic analysis suggested that ecotin has an exogenous target, possibly neutrophil elastase. Ecotin from E. coli, Yersinia pestis, and Pseudomonas aeruginosa, all species that encounter the mammalian immune system, inhibit neutrophil elastase strongly while ecotin from the plant pathogen Pantoea citrea inhibits neutrophil elastase 1000-fold less potently. Ecotins all potently inhibit pancreatic digestive peptidases trypsin and chymotrypsin, while showing more variable inhibition of the blood peptidases Factor Xa, thrombin, and urokinase-type plasminogen activator.
