= TM5441 =

Chemical compound

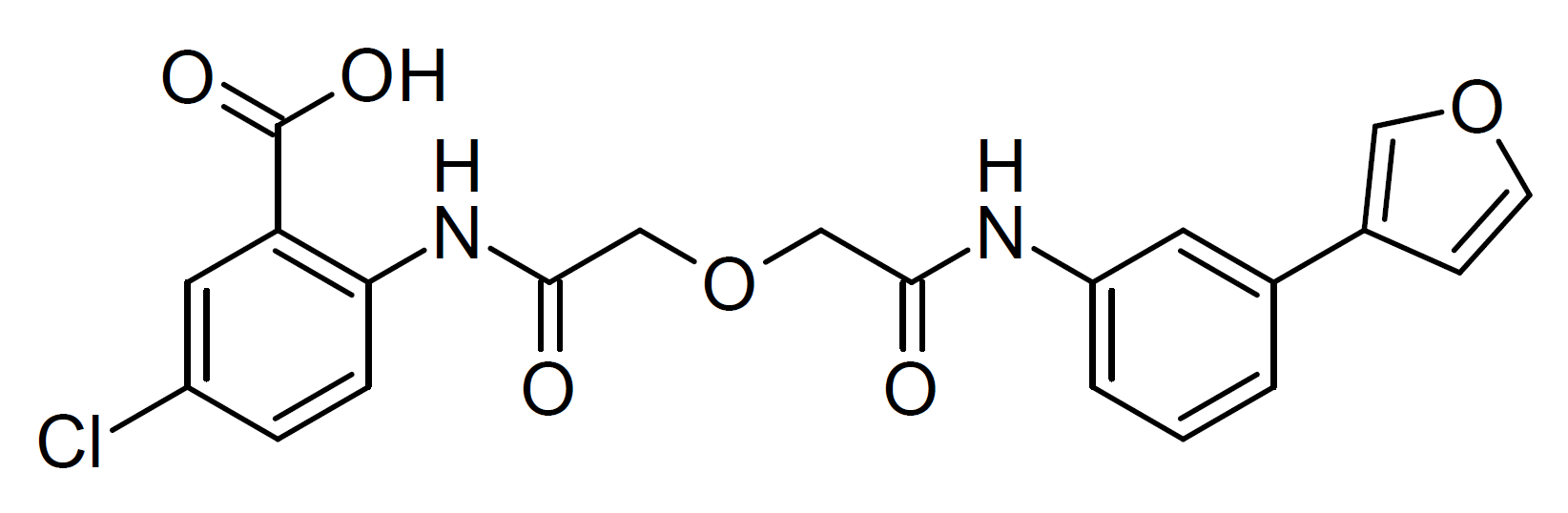

Clinical data
- ATC code: None

Identifiers
- IUPAC name: 5-chloro-2-(2-(2-((3-(furan-3-yl)phenyl)amino)-2-oxoethoxy)acetamido)benzoic acid
- CAS Number: 1190221-43-2
- PubChem CID: 44250349
- ChemSpider: 60598824
- UNII: 33S35WFR9H
- ChEMBL: ChEMBL4204253

Chemical and physical data
- Formula: C_{21}H_{17}ClN_{2}O_{6}
- Molar mass: 428.83 g·mol^{−1}
- 3D model (JSmol): Interactive image
- SMILES: C1=CC(=CC(=C1)NC(=O)COCC(=O)NC2=C(C=C(C=C2)Cl)C(=O)O)C3=COC=C3
- InChI: InChI=1S/C21H17ClN2O6/c22-15-4-5-18(17(9-15)21(27)28)24-20(26)12-30-11-19(25)23-16-3-1-2-13(8-16)14-6-7-29-10-14/h1-10H,11-12H2,(H,23,25)(H,24,26)(H,27,28); Key:BGGMLMAPVODXAU-UHFFFAOYSA-N

TM5441 is a drug which acts as an inhibitor of the serpin protein plasminogen activator inhibitor-1 (PAI-1). By inhibiting PAI-1, it increases activity of the enzymes tissue plasminogen activator and urokinase, which are involved in the blood clotting cascade. It has been researched for conditions such as hepatic steatosis and diabetic nephropathy, and while it has not been developed for medical use, it is widely used in scientific research.
