= Tiplasinin =

Chemical compound

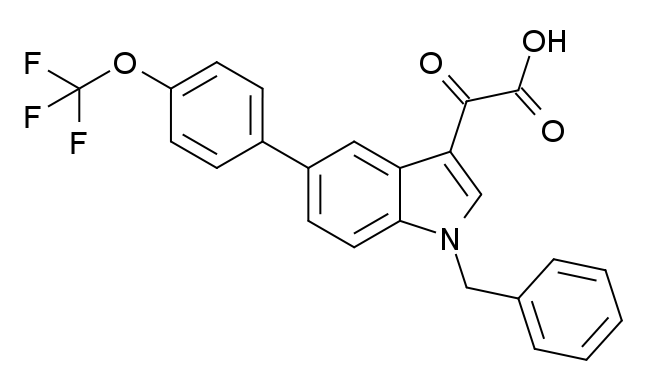

Clinical data
- Other names: Tiplaxtinin; PAI-039
- ATC code: None

Identifiers
- IUPAC name: (1-benzyl-5-(4-(trifluoromethoxy)phenyl)-1H-indol-3-yl)oxoacetic acid
- CAS Number: 393105-53-8
- PubChem CID: 6450819
- ChemSpider: 4953369
- UNII: L396QIB983
- KEGG: D06160
- CompTox Dashboard (EPA): DTXSID30192548

Chemical and physical data
- Formula: C_{24}H_{16}F_{3}NO_{4}
- Molar mass: 439.390 g·mol^{−1}
- 3D model (JSmol): Interactive image
- SMILES: c2ccccc2Cn(cc1C(=O)C(O)=O)c4c1cc(cc4)-c(cc3)ccc3OC(F)(F)F

Tiplasinin (INN, USAN) or tiplaxtinin (PAI-039) is a drug which acts as an inhibitor of the serpin protein plasminogen activator inhibitor-1 (PAI-1), thereby increasing activity of the enzymes tissue plasminogen activator and urokinase, which are involved in the blood clotting cascade. Inhibition of PAI-1 can help to prevent damage to blood vessel walls that occurs as a consequence of chronic high blood pressure, as well as preventing the formation of blood clots that can lead to stroke and heart attack, and potentially also providing a novel treatment mechanism to slow the development of diabetes and obesity. Tiplasinin was unsuccessful in human clinical trials due to an unfavourable risk to benefit ratio and the need for tight dose control to avoid provoking bleeding disorders, however it is still widely used in scientific research and newer drugs sharing the same mechanism of action are likely to be developed for medical use in future.
