= Plasminogen activator =

Type of protein

Fibrinolysis

Plasminogen activators are serine proteases that catalyze the activation of plasmin via proteolytic cleavage of its zymogen form plasminogen. Plasmin is an important factor in fibrinolysis, the breakdown of fibrin polymers formed during blood clotting. There are two main plasminogen activators: urokinase (uPA) and tissue plasminogen activator (tPA). Tissue plasminogen activators are used to treat medical conditions related to blood clotting including embolic or thrombotic stroke, myocardial infarction, and pulmonary embolism.

Plasminogen activators are inhibited by plasminogen activator inhibitor-1, plasminogen activator inhibitor-2, and protein C inhibitor.

== Function ==
Produced mainly in the liver, plasminogen is the inactive zymogen form of plasmin, and circulates in plasma in a closed conformation that cannot be activated. Binding clots or cell surfaces cause their conformation to change, allowing them to be activated by plasminogen activators. Plasminogen activators do so by cleaving the R561/V562 peptide bond, producing the active protein plasmin, which catalyzes the degradation of fibrin polymers that make up the structure of blood clots.

3-dimensional structure of tPA

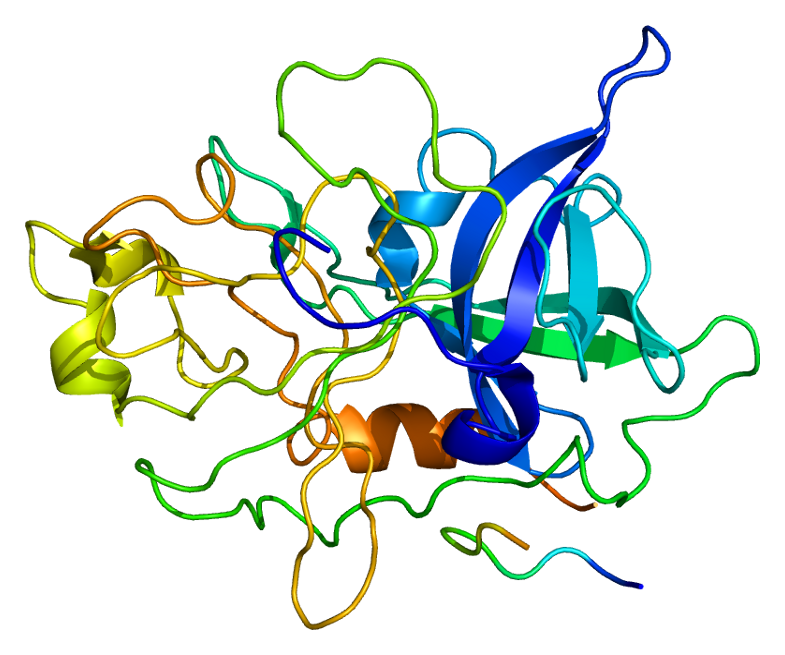
3-dimensional structure of uPA

== Inhibition ==
The main inhibitor of tissue plasminogen activator and urokinase is plasminogen activator inhibitor-1 (PAI-1). Plasminogen activator inhibitor-1 is a serine protease, synthesized by endothelial cells, that specifically inhibits tissue plasminogen activator (tPA) and urokinase (uPA). Tissue plasminogen activator and urokinase are the activators of plasminogen and result in the breakdown of blood clots (fibrinolysis).

PAI-1 levels have also been studied in patients and how they influence certain diseases. Elevated serum levels of PAI-1 have been found in obese individuals. Elevated levels of PAI-1 also seem to increase the risk of atherothrombotic events and may also promote vascular disease.

Plasminogen activator inhibitor-2 (PAI-2) is a serine protease that inactivates tPA and uPA. PAI-2 is produced by the placenta and only found in high quantities in the blood during pregnancy.

== Factors ==
Factor XIa and XIIa are two main factors involved in the plasminogen activator. Factor XI (FXI) is a serine protase produced by the liver and circulates in its inactive form. Deficiency in factor XI is known to cause hemophilia C. Factor XIIa is another plasma protein that is involved in the activation of zymogen factor is activated into factor XIa. This activation is important to the coagulation cascade.

== Applications ==
Due to its contribution to fibrinolysis, tissue plasminogen activator is used medically to treat blood clot-related disorders including thrombotic or embolic stroke, myocardial infarction, and pulmonary embolism. It is manufactured using recombinant techniques and is sold as alteplase, reteplase, and tenecteplase. Alteplase was the first of these versions to go on the market, and has the same structure as tPA. Reteplase and tenecteplase both received FDA approval after alteplase, and have nonidentical structures to tPA. These recombinant forms of tPA have been shown to have a longer half-life in the blood and greater resistance to inhibition, resulting in an increased capacity to treat thrombolytic diseases.

Urokinase is similarly used in the medical field, specifically for the treatment of pulmonary embolism.

== Plasminogen Activator Role in Breast Cancer ==
PLG
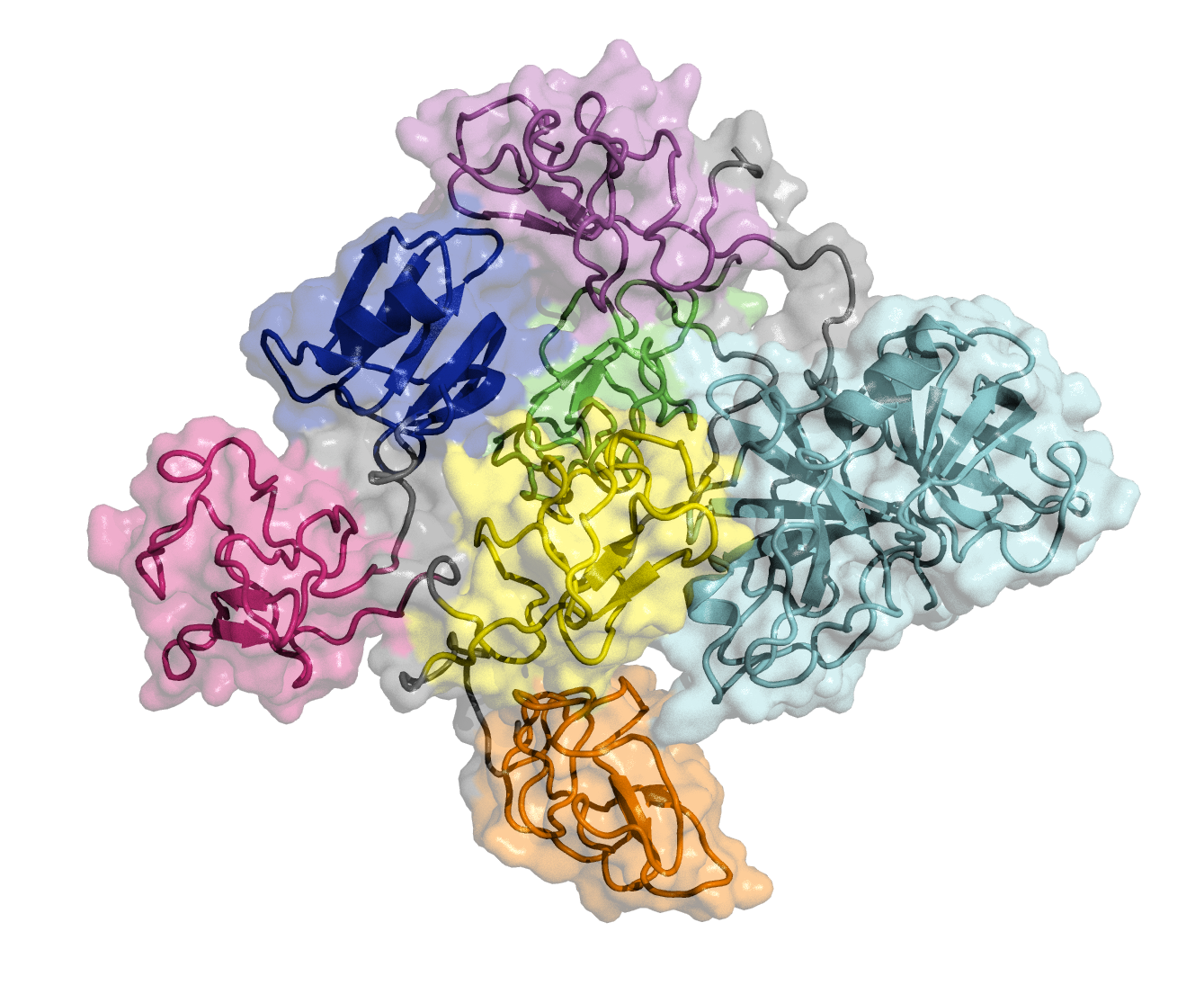
Available structures
PDB	Ortholog search: PDBe RCSB
PDB	List of PDB id codes 1B2I, 1BML, 1BUI, 1CEA, 1CEB, 1DDJ, 1HPJ, 1HPK, 1I5K, 1KI0, 1KRN, 1L4D, 1L4Z, 1PK4, 1PKR, 1PMK, 1QRZ, 1RJX, 2DOH, 2DOI, 2KNF, 2L0S, 2PK4, 3UIR, 4A5T, 4CIK, 4DCB, 4DUR, 4DUU, 5HPG

Identifiers
- Aliases: PLG, plasminogen, plasmin, HAE4
- External IDs: OMIM: 173350; MGI: 97620; HomoloGene: 55452; GeneCards: PLG; OMA:PLG - orthologs

Gene location (Human)
Chr.	Chromosome 6 (human)
Band	6q26	Start	160,702,238 bp
Band	6q26	End	160,754,097 bp

Gene location (Mouse)
Chr.	Chromosome 17 (mouse)
Band	17 A1|17 8.5 cM	Start	12,597,495 bp
Band	17 A1|17 8.5 cM	End	12,638,272 bp
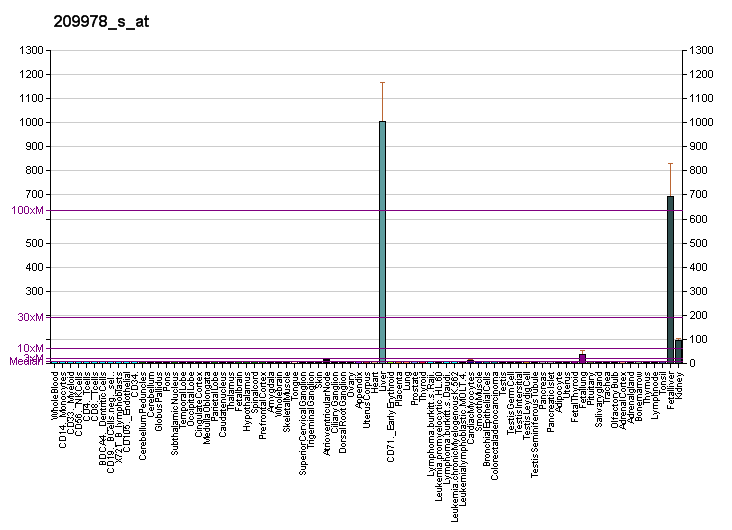

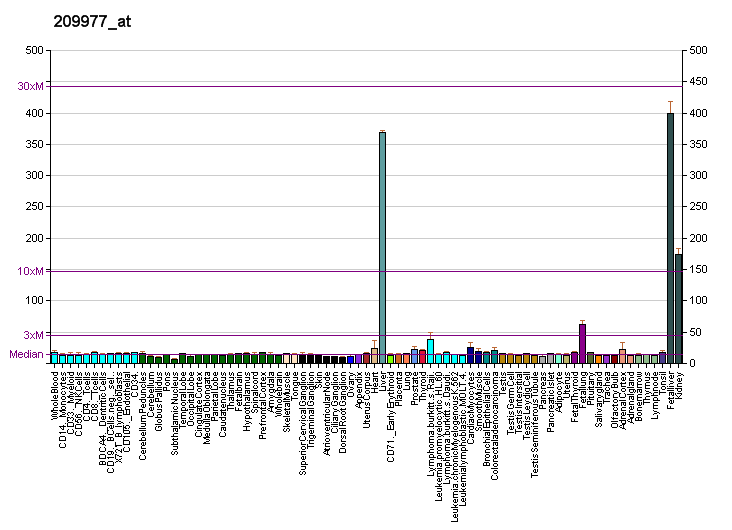

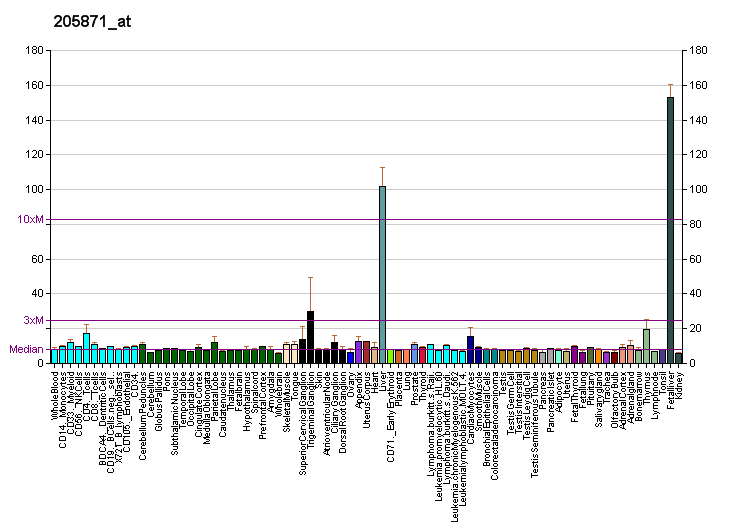
RNA expression pattern
Bgee	Human / Mouse (ortholog); Top expressed in: right lobe of liver; kidney tubule; metanephric glomerulus; human kidney; Descending thoracic aorta; ascending aorta; testicle; tibial nerve; right coronary artery; gonad / Top expressed in: left lobe of liver; gallbladder; human fetus; yolk sac; fetal liver hematopoietic progenitor cell; sexually immature organism; abdominal wall; primitive streak; embryo; thoracic diaphragm; More reference expression data
BioGPS	More reference expression data
Gene ontology
Molecular function	apolipoprotein binding; protein domain specific binding; peptidase activity; protein binding; serine-type peptidase activity; signaling receptor binding; hydrolase activity; serine-type endopeptidase activity; chaperone binding; proteasome core complex binding; protein antigen binding; endopeptidase activity; enzyme binding; kinase binding
Cellular component	blood microparticle; extracellular region; cell surface; extrinsic component of external side of plasma membrane; extracellular exosome; platelet alpha granule lumen; extracellular space; plasma membrane; extrinsic component of plasma membrane; intracellular membrane-bounded organelle; collagen-containing extracellular matrix
Biological process	hemostasis; negative regulation of cell-substrate adhesion; negative regulation of fibrinolysis; negative regulation of cell-cell adhesion mediated by cadherin; platelet degranulation; extracellular matrix disassembly; positive regulation of fibrinolysis; tissue remodeling; negative regulation of cell population proliferation; blood coagulation; proteolysis; fibrinolysis; positive regulation of blood vessel endothelial cell migration; tissue regeneration; myoblast differentiation; muscle cell cellular homeostasis; proteolysis involved in cellular protein catabolic process; trophoblast giant cell differentiation; labyrinthine layer blood vessel development; mononuclear cell migration
Sources:Amigo / QuickGO
Orthologs
Species	Human	Mouse
Entrez	5340	18815
Ensembl	ENSG00000122194	ENSMUSG00000059481
UniProt	P00747	P20918
RefSeq (mRNA)	NM_001168338; NM_000301	NM_008877
RefSeq (protein)	NP_000292; NP_001161810	NP_032903
Location (UCSC)	Chr 6: 160.7 – 160.75 Mb	Chr 17: 12.6 – 12.64 Mb
PubMed search
- Wikidata
View/Edit Human	View/Edit Mouse

Plasminogen activator inhibitor-1 not only functions as an inhibitor, but other roles of PAI-1 could suggest it could contribute to cancer. The other roles of PAI-1 include, cell de-adhesion, cell proliferation, apoptosis, and cell signaling. These roles could suggest that PAI-1 expression in the tumor microenvironment enhances tumor cell progression. Urokinase cleaves the zymogen plasminogen into serine protease plasmin. The elevated levels of uPA are an indicator of cancer which could be found in the carcinoma of the breast. Plasmin can activate matrix metalloproteases (MMP's) in the extracellular matrix (ECM). MMP activation contributes to tumor cell invasion and metastasis by degradation of ECM components.
