= ORM1 =

Protein-coding gene in the species Homo sapiens

Identifiers
- Aliases: ORM1, AGP-A, AGP1, HEL-S-153w, ORM, orosomucoid 1
- External IDs: OMIM: 138600; MGI: 97445; GeneCards: ORM1
Available structures
PDB	Ortholog search: PDBe RCSB
PDB	List of PDB id codes 3KQ0

Gene location (Human)
Chr.	Chromosome 9 (human)
Band	9q32	Start	114,323,098 bp
Band	9q32	End	114,326,479 bp

Gene location (Mouse)
Chr.	Chromosome 4 (mouse)
Band	4 B3|4 33.96 cM	Start	63,274,399 bp
Band	4 B3|4 33.96 cM	End	63,277,748 bp
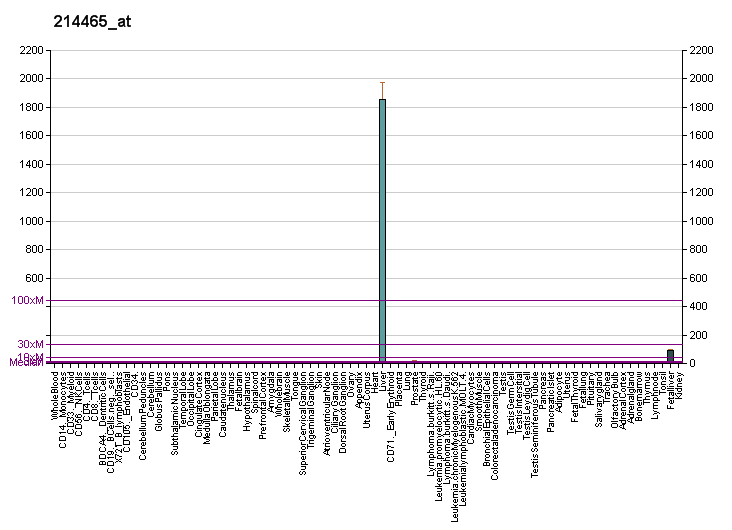

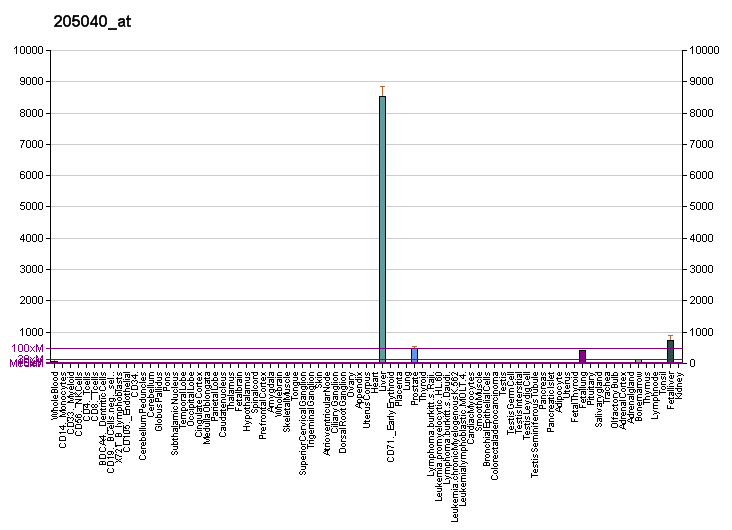

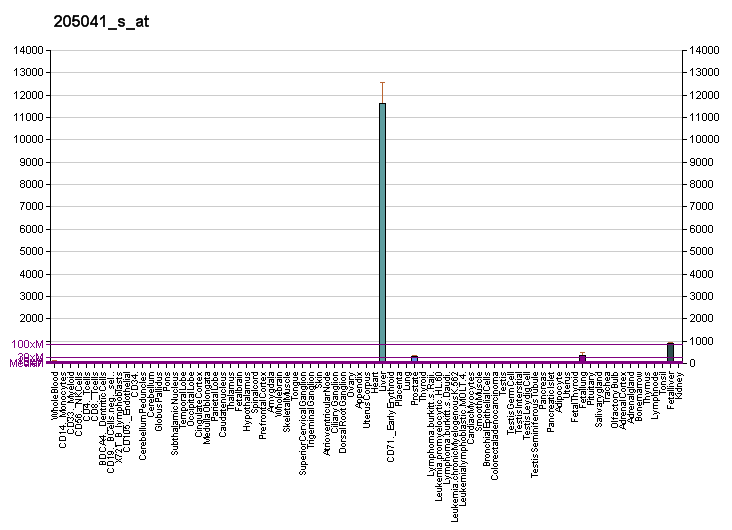
RNA expression pattern
Bgee	Human / Mouse (ortholog); Top expressed in: right lobe of liver; testicle; bone marrow; bone marrow cell; blood; trabecular bone; granulocyte; right lung; right adrenal gland; upper lobe of left lung / Top expressed in: seminal vesicula; granulocyte; embryo; adrenal gland; white adipose tissue; liver; brown adipose tissue; tunica adventitia of aorta; left lobe of liver; neural layer of retina; More reference expression data
BioGPS	More reference expression data
Gene ontology
Molecular function	protein binding
Cellular component	blood microparticle; extracellular exosome; platelet alpha granule lumen; extracellular space; specific granule lumen; tertiary granule lumen; extracellular matrix; extracellular region; collagen-containing extracellular matrix
Biological process	negative regulation of interleukin-6 production; negative regulation of tumor necrosis factor production; regulation of immune system process; inflammatory response; acute-phase response; platelet degranulation; neutrophil degranulation; transport
Sources:Amigo / QuickGO
Orthologs
Databases	NCBI: entry; OMA: entry
Species	Human	Mouse
Entrez	5004	18407
Ensembl	ENSG00000229314	ENSMUSG00000028359
UniProt	P02763	Q63805
RefSeq (mRNA)	NM_000607	NM_013623; NM_001379520; NM_001379521
RefSeq (protein)	NP_000598	n/a
Location (UCSC)	Chr 9: 114.32 – 114.33 Mb	Chr 4: 63.27 – 63.28 Mb
PubMed search
- Wikidata
View/Edit Human	View/Edit Mouse

Alpha-1-acid glycoprotein 1 is a protein that in humans is encoded by the ORM1 gene.

This gene encodes a key acute phase plasma protein. Because of its increase due to acute inflammation, this protein is classified as an acute-phase reactant. The specific function of this protein has not yet been determined; however, it may be involved in aspects of immunosuppression.

== Interactions ==
ORM1 has been shown to interact with Plasminogen activator inhibitor-1.

== See also ==
- Orosomucoid
