= Upamostat =

Chemical compound

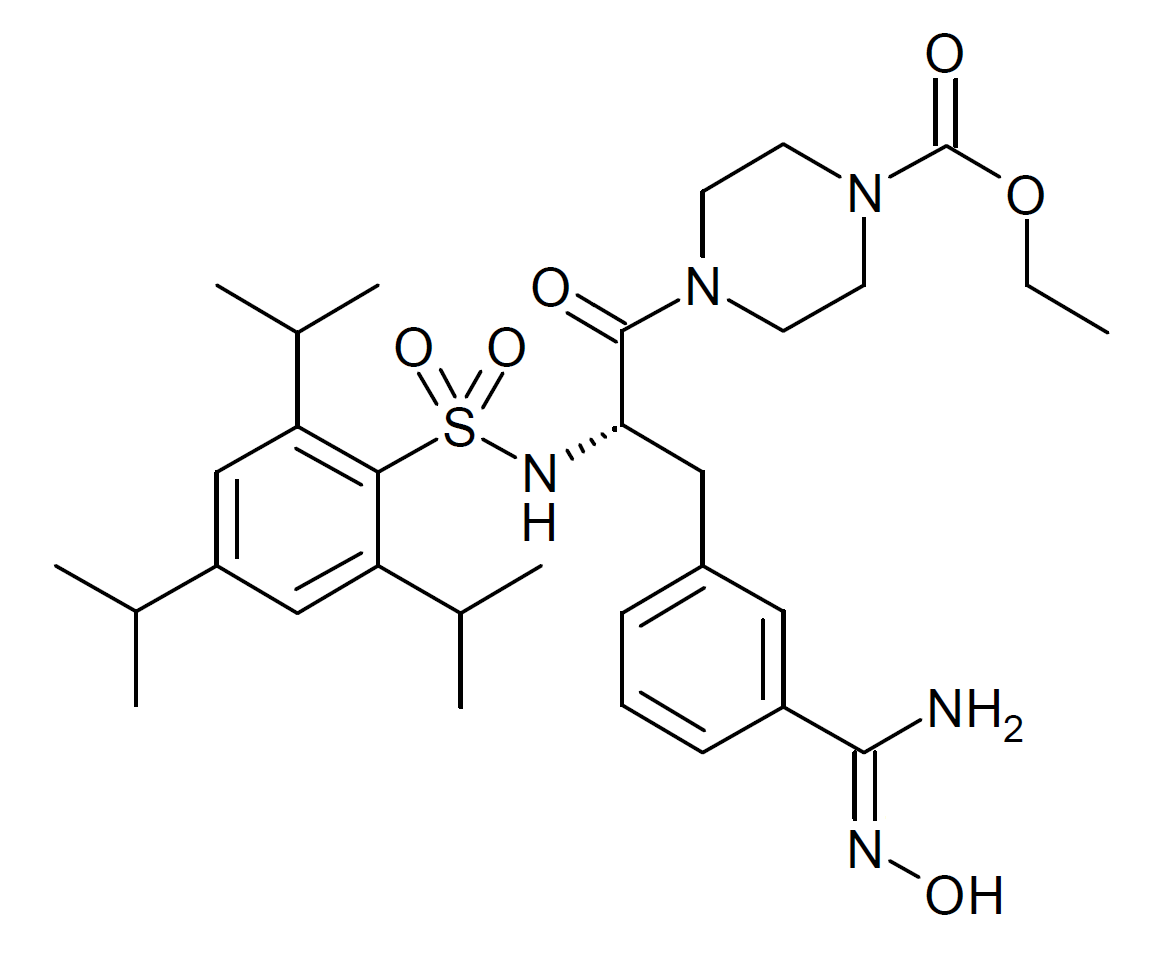

Legal status
- Legal status: Investigational new drug

Identifiers
- IUPAC name: ethyl 4-[(2S)-3-[3-[(E)-N'-hydroxycarbamimidoyl]phenyl]-2-[[2,4,6-tri(propan-2-yl)phenyl]sulfonylamino]propanoyl]piperazine-1-carboxylate
- CAS Number: 1191101-18-4
- PubChem CID: 9852201
- DrugBank: DB13052
- ChemSpider: 28189283
- UNII: S5M7KW6U17

Chemical and physical data
- Formula: C_{32}H_{47}N_{5}O_{6}S
- Molar mass: 629.82 g·mol^{−1}
- 3D model (JSmol): Interactive image
- SMILES: CCOC(=O)N1CCN(CC1)C(=O)[C@H](CC2=CC(=CC=C2)/C(=N\O)/N)NS(=O)(=O)C3=C(C=C(C=C3C(C)C)C(C)C)C(C)C
- InChI: InChI=1S/C32H47N5O6S/c1-8-43-32(39)37-14-12-36(13-15-37)31(38)28(17-23-10-9-11-24(16-23)30(33)34-40)35-44(41,42)29-26(21(4)5)18-25(20(2)3)19-27(29)22(6)7/h9-11,16,18-22,28,35,40H,8,12-15,17H2,1-7H3,(H2,33,34)/t28-/m0/s1; Key:HUASEDVYRABWCV-NDEPHWFRSA-N

Upamostat (WX-671, Mesupron) is a drug which acts as an inhibitor of the serine protease enzyme urokinase. It is under development as a potential treatment agent for pancreatic cancer, acting to inhibit tumour metastasis.
