= Plasminogen activator inhibitor-2 =

Coagulation factor protein found in humans

SERPINB2
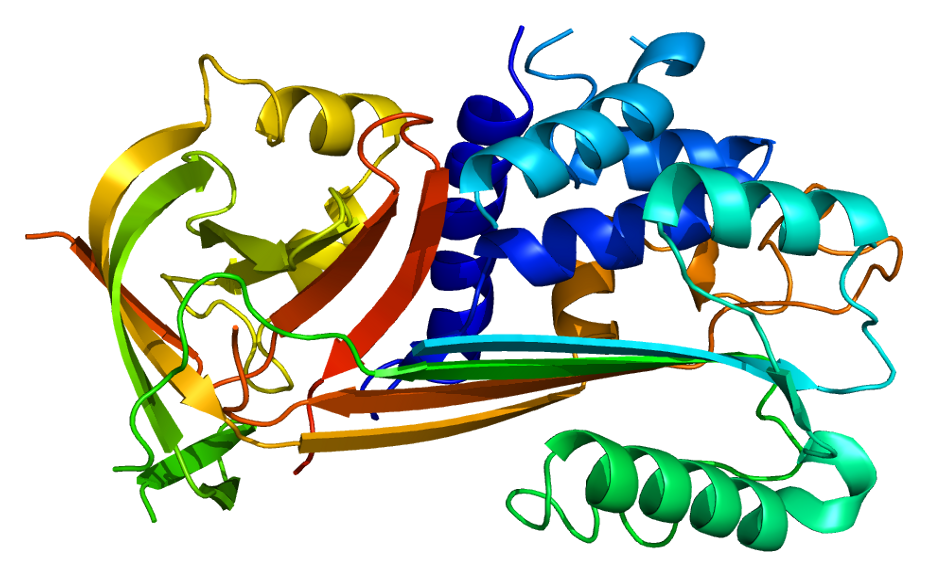

Identifiers
- Aliases: SERPINB2, HsT1201, PAI, PAI-2, PAI2, PLANH2, serpin family B member 2
- External IDs: OMIM: 173390; MGI: 97609; GeneCards: SERPINB2
Available structures
PDB	Ortholog search: PDBe RCSB
PDB	List of PDB id codes 2ARR, 1BY7, 1JRR, 2ARQ

Gene location (Human)
Chr.	Chromosome 18 (human)
Band	18q21.33-q22.1	Start	63,871,692 bp
Band	18q21.33-q22.1	End	63,903,888 bp

Gene location (Mouse)
Chr.	Chromosome 1 (mouse)
Band	1 E2.1|1 50.34 cM	Start	107,439,153 bp
Band	1 E2.1|1 50.34 cM	End	107,463,208 bp
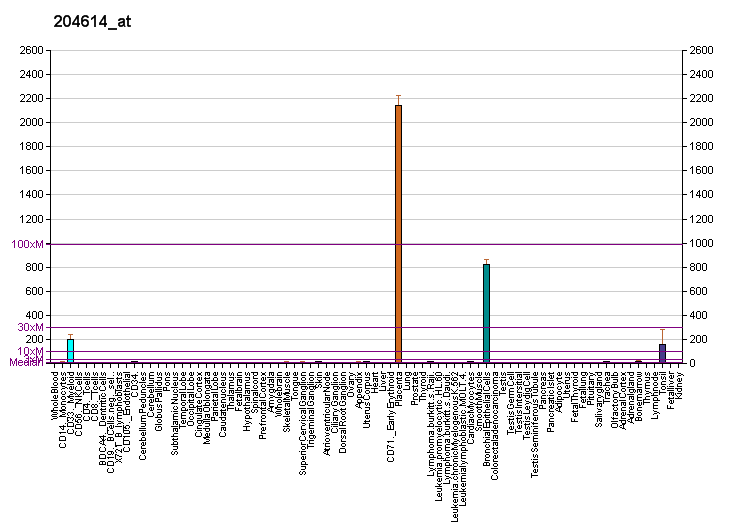
RNA expression pattern
Bgee	Human / Mouse (ortholog); Top expressed in: amniotic fluid; mucosa of pharynx; skin of thigh; oral cavity; skin of hip; decidua; epithelium of nasopharynx; skin of arm; islet of Langerhans; gums / Top expressed in: skin of external ear; esophagus; skin of back; lip; skin of abdomen; granulocyte; superior surface of tongue; umbilical cord; epidermis; cervix; More reference expression data
BioGPS	More reference expression data
Gene ontology
Molecular function	peptidase inhibitor activity; serine-type endopeptidase inhibitor activity
Cellular component	extracellular region; plasma membrane; extracellular space; cytoplasm
Biological process	negative regulation of peptidase activity; wound healing; negative regulation of apoptotic process; fibrinolysis; negative regulation of endopeptidase activity; interleukin-12-mediated signaling pathway
Sources:Amigo / QuickGO
Orthologs
Databases	NCBI: entry; OMA: entry
Species	Human	Mouse
Entrez	5055	18788
Ensembl	ENSG00000197632	ENSMUSG00000062345
UniProt	P05120	P12388
RefSeq (mRNA)	NM_002575; NM_001143818	NM_001174170; NM_011111
RefSeq (protein)	NP_001137290; NP_002566	NP_001167641; NP_035241
Location (UCSC)	Chr 18: 63.87 – 63.9 Mb	Chr 1: 107.44 – 107.46 Mb
PubMed search
- Wikidata
View/Edit Human	View/Edit Mouse

Plasminogen activator inhibitor-2 (placental PAI, SerpinB2, PAI-2), a serine protease inhibitor of the serpin superfamily, is a coagulation factor that inactivates tissue plasminogen activator and urokinase. It is present in most cells, especially monocytes/macrophages. PAI-2 exists in two forms, a 60-kDa extracellular glycosylated form and a 43-kDa intracellular form.

Fibrinolysis (simplified). Blue arrows denote stimulation, and red arrows inhibition.

It is present only at detectable quantities in blood during pregnancy, as it is produced by the placenta, and may explain partially the increased rate of thrombosis during pregnancy. The majority of expressed PAI-2 remains unsecreted due to the presence of an inefficient internal signal peptide.

== Interactions ==
PAI-2 has been reported to bind a series of intracellular and extracellular proteins. Whether PAI-2's physiological function is inhibition of the extracellular protease urokinase and/or whether PAI-2 has intracellular activities remains controversial. At least one of PAI-2's physiological functions may involve regulation of adaptive immunity.

== Structure and polymerization ==
Like other serpins, PAI-2 has three beta sheets (A, B, C) and nine alpha helices (hA-hI). The structure of PAI-2 mutants have been solved, in which the 33-amino acid loop connecting helices C and D is deleted. This CD-loop is particularly flexible and difficult to stabilize, as the loop is known to translocate up to 54 Å during the formation of intramolecular disulfide bonds. In addition to the CD-loop, notable motifs include the reactive center loop (RCL) spanning amino acids 379-383 and an N-terminal hydrophobic signal sequence.

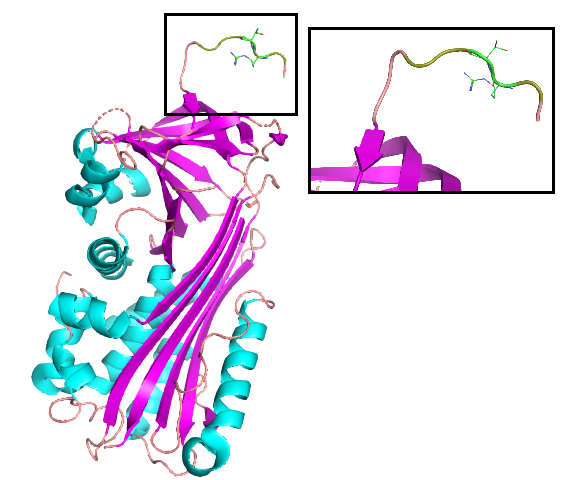
Reactive center loop (RCL) of plasminogen activator inhibitor-2. PyMol rendering of PDB 2ARR.

Despite their similar inhibitory targets, PAI-2 is phylogenetically distant from its counterpart plasminogen activator inhibitor-1 (PAI-1). As a member of the ovalbumin-related serpin family, PAI-2 is genetically similar to chicken ovalbumin (Gallus gallus), and is a close mammalian homolog. Both ovalbumin and PAI-2 undergo secretion via uncleaved secretory signal peptides, although PAI-2 secretion is relatively much less efficient.

PAI-2 exists in three polymeric states: monomeric, polymerigenic, and polymer (inactive state). Polymerization occurs by a so-called "loop-sheet" mechanism, in which the RCL of one molecule sequentially inserts into the A-beta-sheet of the next molecule. This process occurs preferentially when PAI-2 is in its polymerigenic form, which is stabilized by a disulfide bond between Cys-79 (located in the CD-loop) and Cys-161. When PAI-2 is in its monomeric form, the CD-loop is vastly out-of-position for this disulfide linkage, and it must translocate a distance of 54 Å to become sufficiently close to Cys-161. Nevertheless, since the CD-loop is quite flexible, the monomeric and polymerigenic forms are fully interconvertible, and one state can be favored over the other by altering the redox environment of the protein. Polymerization of PAI-2 occurs spontaneously under physiological conditions, for instance in the cytosol of placental cells. Cytosolic PAI-2 tends to be monomeric, while PAI-2 in secretory organelles (which tend to be more oxidizing than the cytosol) is more prone to polymerization. For these combined reasons, it is thought that PAI-2 may sense and respond to environmental redox potential.

== Mechanism ==
PAI-2 uses a suicide inhibition mechanism (a common mechanism for serpins) to irreversibly inactivate tissue plasminogen activator and urokinase. First, the target serine protease docks to PAI-2 and catalyzes cleavage of the RCL, between residues Arg-380 and Thr-381. At this point, two outcomes are possible: the protease escapes, leaving an inactive PAI-2; or the protease forms a permanent, covalently-bonded complex with PAI-2, in which the protease is significantly distorted.

== Biological functions ==
Although extracellular (glycosylated) PAI-2 functions to regulate fibrinolysis, it remains unclear whether this inhibitory role is the main function of PAI-2. PAI-2 is predominantly intracellular. The secretory signal peptide of PAI-2 is relatively inefficient, perhaps by evolutionary design, as various mutations to the signal sequence can significantly enhance secretion efficiency. PAI-2 is undetectable in adult plasma, and is typically only detectable during pregnancy, in myelomonocytic leukemias, or in gingival crevicular fluid; moreover, PAI-2 is a slower inhibitor than its counterpart PAI-1 by orders of magnitude (based on second order rate constants). On the other hand, detailed intracellular roles for PAI-2 have not yet been conclusively established.

PAI-2 is upregulated during both pregnancy and immune responses. During pregnancy, PAI-2 is particularly present in the decidua and amniotic fluid, where it may protect membranes from digestion and aid in remodeling fetal and uterine tissues. PAI-2 assists PAI-1 in regulating fibrinolysis and may help prevent overexpression of PAI-1, which increases risk of thrombosis. Over the course of a pregnancy, PAI-2 plasma concentration rises from nearly-undetectable levels to 250 ng/mL (mostly in glycosylated form).

Among immune cells, macrophages are the main producers of PAI-2, as both B-cells and T-cells do not produce significant amounts. PAI-2 plays a role in inflammatory responses and infections, potentially in downregulating T cells that secrete IgG2c and interferon type II.

Due to its position on chromosome 18 close to the bcl-2 protooncogene and several other serpins, PAI-2's role in apoptosis has been investigated, but current evidence remains inconclusive. A recent study suggests PAI-2 may be a direct downstream target and activator of p53, and may directly stabilize p21; in addition, PAI-2 expression is increased in senescent fibroblasts and may arrest growth of young fibroplasts.

== Potential roles in cancer ==
The role of PAI-2 in cancer growth and metastasis is complex, as PAI-2 may have tumor-promoting and tumor-inhibiting effects. Notably, it is high expression of PAI-2 by tumor cells, not the host organism, which influences cancer growth. Cancer cells may facilitate export of PAI-2 via microparticles.

PAI-2 provides protection for cancer cells against plasmin-induced cell death, which can exert a lethal effect on tumors. This protection is particularly salient in brain metastases, which tend to express high levels of PAI-2 and neuroserpin, and whose growth may be partially inhibited by knockout of PAI-2. Due to its high expression in tumor cells, PAI-2 has been used to track and study the spread of angiotropic melanoma cells.

Although PAI-2 expression can promote metastasis to the brain, in other cases high PAI-2 expression significantly decreases metastasis to the lungs and other organs. The particular effects of PAI-2 on metastasis may depend on cancer type and location in the body.

== See also ==
- Plasminogen activator inhibitor-1
- Serpin
