= Wheat germ agglutinin =

Protein found in wheat

Agglutinin isolectin 1

Identifiers
- Organism: Triticum aestivum
- Symbol: WGA1
- Orthologs: OMA: entry
- PDB: 2uvo
- UniProt: P10968
Search for
- Structures: Swiss-model
- Domains: InterPro

Wheat germ agglutinin (WGA) is a lectin that protects wheat (Triticum) from insects, yeast and bacteria. An agglutinin protein, it binds to N-acetyl-D-glucosamine and sialic acid. WGA has also been shown to interact with sialic acid residues on oligosaccharides. Succinylated WGA is selective for β-N-acetylglucosamine (β-GlcNAc), making it a useful tool for detecting O-GlcNAc. WGA is composed of a mixture of three isoforms (WGA1, WGA2, WGA3), which are quite similar to each other and each contain an unusually high amount of glycine. These three isoforms vary at a total of 10 amino acid positions and all have dimeric structures with four domains per monomer. Each domain (WGA.A, WGA.B, WGA.C, WGA.D) is hevein-like and is stabilized by a disulfide bond. N-acetyl-D-glucosamine in the natural environment of wheat is found in the chitin of insects, and the cell membrane of yeast & bacteria. WGA is found abundantly—but not exclusively—in the wheat kernel, where it got the 'germ' name from. In mammals the N-acetyl-D-glucosamine that WGA binds to is found in cartilage and cornea among other places. In those animals sialic acid is found in mucous membranes, e.g. the lining of the inner nose, and digestive tract.

In solution, WGA exists mostly as a heterodimer of 38,000 daltons. It is cationic at physiological pH. It contains a Carbohydrate-binding module called CBM18.

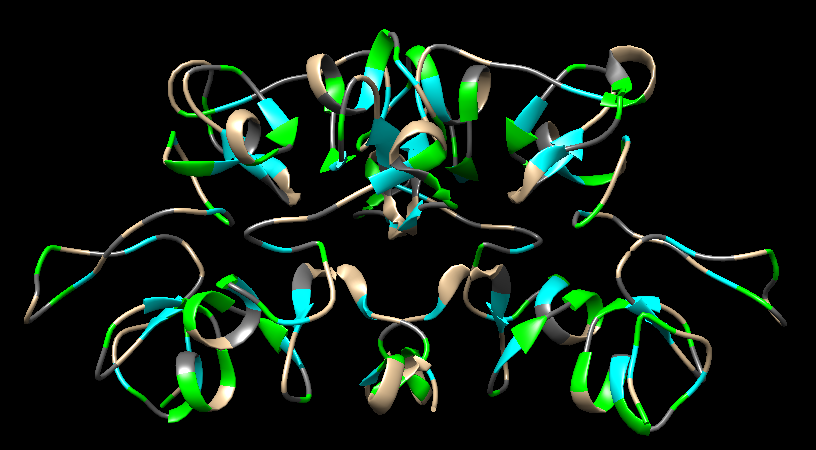
The above image shows WGA3 in the program Chimera (PDB code 1WGT). The cyan color shows the cysteine residues, the light green color shows the glycine residues, and the dark gray color shows the remaining hydrophobic residues.

== Use in molecular biology ==
WGA is also widely used in biological research, particularly in the field of glycobiology. Since WGA binds to glycoconjugates, it can be used to label cell membranes, fibrotic scar tissue and arbuscular mycorrhizae for imaging and analysis. WGA is fairly stable in acidic solutions, and can be resistant to proteolysis. WGA has also demonstrated some cytotoxicity and has thus been used in recent research involving hematological cancers, particularly acute myeloid leukemia. In addition, WGA has been thought to improve drug delivery due to its ability to cross the blood-brain barrier, but research has yet to be performed on this hypothesis.

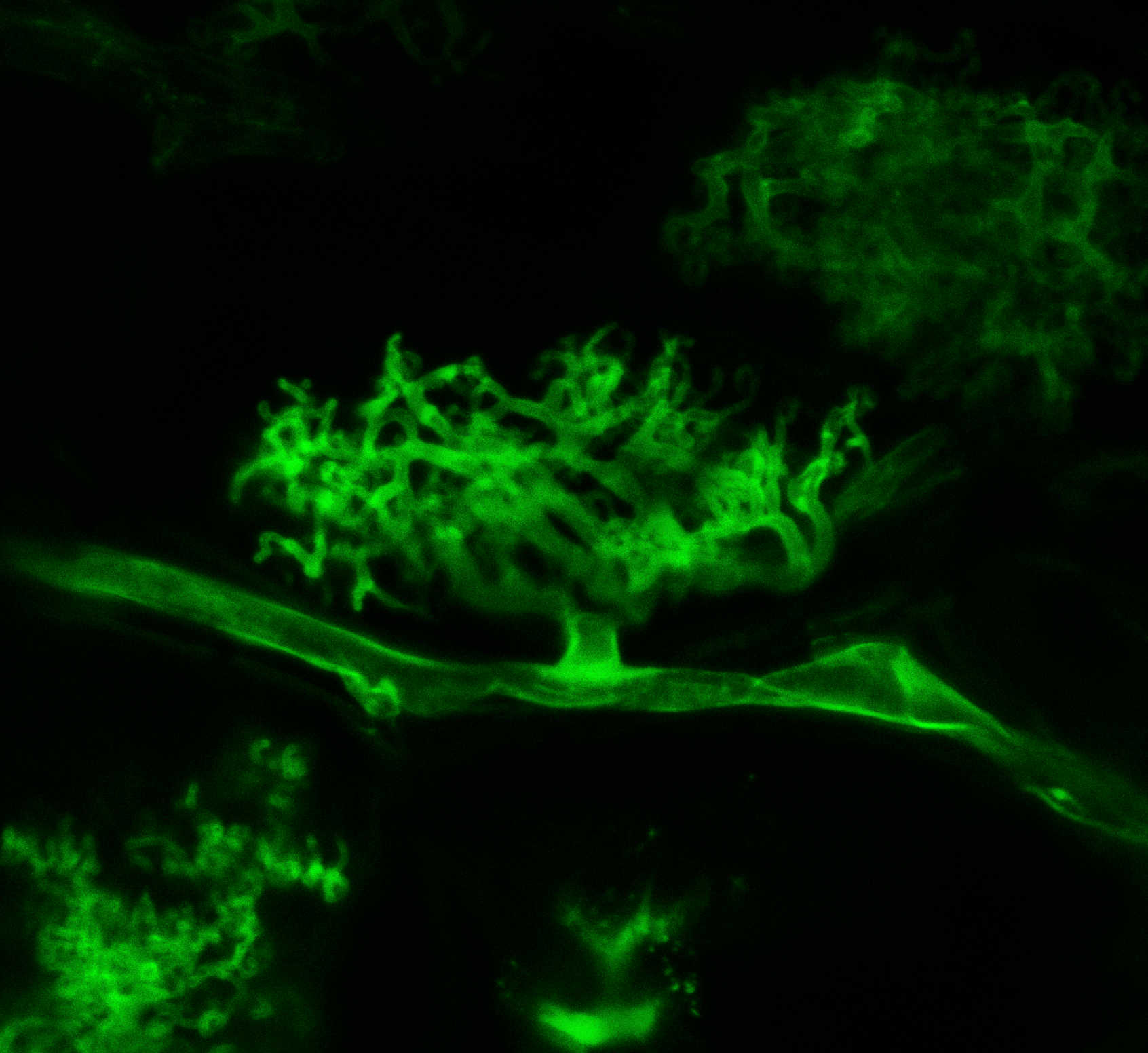
A fluorescent microscopy image of a fungal arbuscule stained with WGA and Alexa Fluor

== See also ==
- Proteopedia: 2uvo – High resolution crystal structure of Wheat Germ Agglutinin in complex with N-acetyl-D-glucosamine
- Proteopedia: 2uwg – Crystal structure of Wheat Germ Agglutinin isolectin 1 in complex with glycosylurethan
