= Thrombin inhibitor =

Thrombin inhibitor may refer to:

- Direct thrombin inhibitor
- Indirect thrombin inhibitor, such as warfarin
