= Plasminogen activator inhibitor-1 =

Human protein

SERPINE1
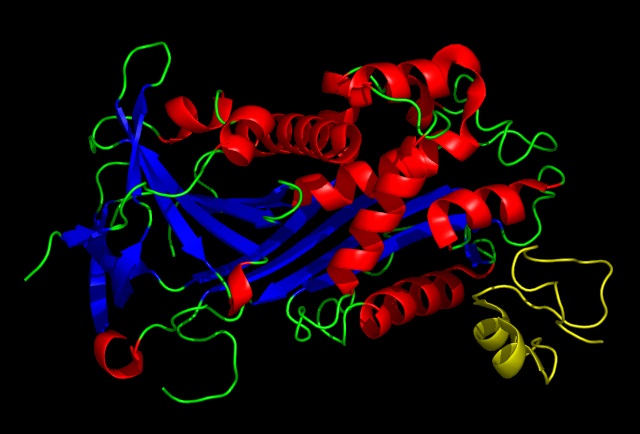

Identifiers
- Aliases: SERPINE1, PAI, PAI-1, PAI1, PLANH1, serpin family E member 1
- External IDs: OMIM: 173360; MGI: 97608; GeneCards: SERPINE1
Available structures
PDB	Ortholog search: PDBe RCSB
PDB	List of PDB id codes 1A7C, 1B3K, 1C5G, 1DB2, 1DVM, 1DVN, 1LJ5, 1OC0, 3CVM, 3EOX, 3PB1, 3Q02, 3Q03, 3R4L, 3UT3, 4AQH, 4G8O, 4G8R, 4IC0, 9PAI, 5BRR,%%s1C5G

Gene location (Human)
Chr.	Chromosome 7 (human)
Band	7q22.1	Start	101,127,104 bp
Band	7q22.1	End	101,139,247 bp

Gene location (Mouse)
Chr.	Chromosome 5 (mouse)
Band	5|5 G2	Start	137,090,358 bp
Band	5|5 G2	End	137,101,122 bp
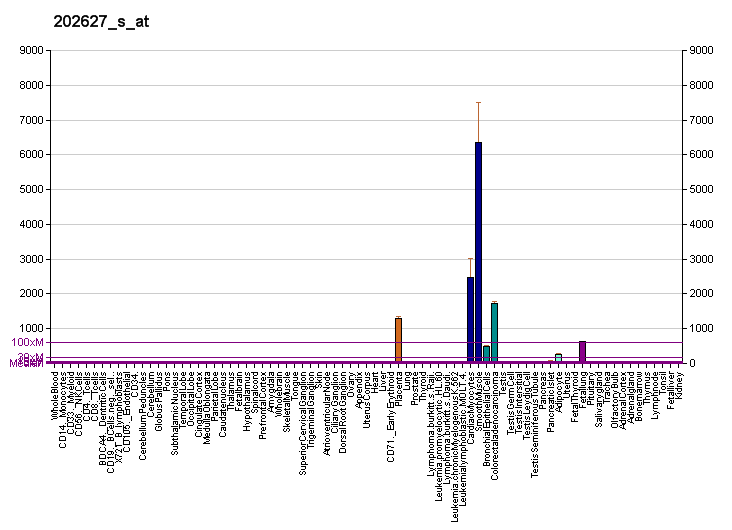

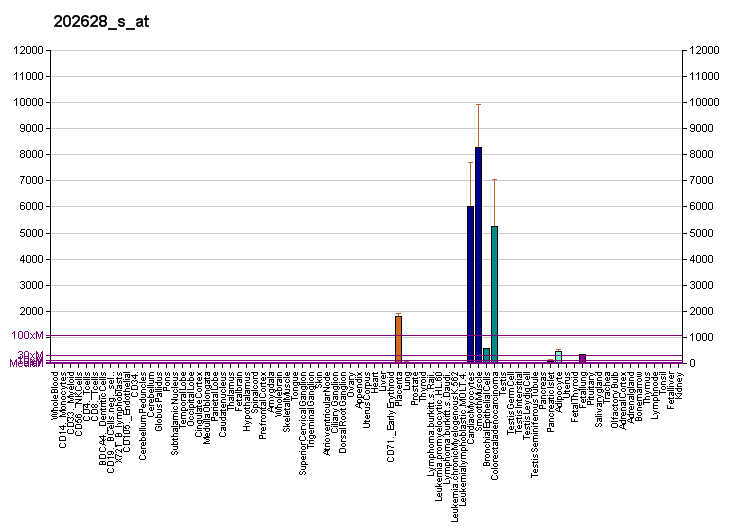
RNA expression pattern
Bgee	Human / Mouse (ortholog); Top expressed in: vena cava; stromal cell of endometrium; decidua; saphenous vein; ascending aorta; gallbladder; Descending thoracic aorta; pericardium; tibial arteries; right coronary artery / Top expressed in: endothelial cell of lymphatic vessel; stroma of bone marrow; decidua; tunica media of zone of aorta; gastrula; ascending aorta; calvaria; aortic valve; muscle of thigh; subcutaneous adipose tissue; More reference expression data
BioGPS	More reference expression data
Gene ontology
Molecular function	peptidase inhibitor activity; protease binding; protein binding; signaling receptor binding; serine-type endopeptidase inhibitor activity
Cellular component	extracellular matrix; plasma membrane; extracellular exosome; platelet alpha granule lumen; extracellular region; extracellular space; collagen-containing extracellular matrix
Biological process	negative regulation of endothelial cell apoptotic process; positive regulation of receptor-mediated endocytosis; negative regulation of peptidase activity; negative regulation of fibrinolysis; positive regulation of inflammatory response; negative regulation of plasminogen activation; fibrinolysis; negative regulation of smooth muscle cell-matrix adhesion; negative regulation of blood coagulation; negative regulation of vascular wound healing; regulation of signaling receptor activity; negative regulation of smooth muscle cell migration; positive regulation of monocyte chemotaxis; platelet degranulation; extracellular matrix organization; positive regulation of angiogenesis; negative regulation of cell migration; positive regulation of blood coagulation; defense response to Gram-negative bacterium; negative regulation of extrinsic apoptotic signaling pathway via death domain receptors; circadian rhythm; angiogenesis; positive regulation of interleukin-8 production; negative regulation of wound healing; cellular response to lipopolysaccharide; negative regulation of cell adhesion mediated by integrin; negative regulation of endopeptidase activity; positive regulation of transcription by RNA polymerase II; positive regulation of leukotriene production involved in inflammatory response; replicative senescence; dentinogenesis; positive regulation of odontoblast differentiation
Sources:Amigo / QuickGO
Orthologs
Databases	NCBI: entry; OMA: entry
Species	Human	Mouse
Entrez	5054	18787
Ensembl	ENSG00000106366	ENSMUSG00000037411
UniProt	P05121	P22777
RefSeq (mRNA)	NM_001165413; NM_000602	NM_008871
RefSeq (protein)	NP_000593; NP_000593.1	NP_032897
Location (UCSC)	Chr 7: 101.13 – 101.14 Mb	Chr 5: 137.09 – 137.1 Mb
PubMed search
- Wikidata
View/Edit Human	View/Edit Mouse

Plasminogen activator inhibitor-1 (PAI-1) also known as endothelial plasminogen activator inhibitor (serpin E1) is a protein that in humans is encoded by the SERPINE1 gene. Elevated PAI-1 is a risk factor for thrombosis and atherosclerosis.

PAI-1 is a serine protease inhibitor (serpin) that functions as the principal inhibitor of tissue-type plasminogen activator (tPA) and urokinase (uPA), the activators of plasminogen and hence fibrinolysis (the physiological breakdown of blood clots). It is a serine protease inhibitor (serpin) protein (SERPINE1).

The other PAI, plasminogen activator inhibitor-2 (PAI-2) is secreted by the placenta and only present in significant amounts during pregnancy. In addition, protease nexin acts as an inhibitor of tPA and urokinase. PAI-1, however, is the main inhibitor of the plasminogen activators.

== Genetics ==
The PAI-1 gene is SERPINE1, located on chromosome 7 (7q21.3-q22). There is a common polymorphism known as 4G/5G in the promoter region. The 5G allele is slightly less transcriptionally active than the 4G.

== Function ==
PAI-1's main function entails the inhibition of urokinase plasminogen activator (uPA), an enzyme responsible for the cleavage of plasminogen to form plasmin. Plasmin mediates the degradation of the extracellular matrix either by itself or in conjunction with matrix metalloproteinases. In this scenario, PAI-1 inhibits uPA via active site binding, preventing the formation of plasmin. Additional inhibition is mediated by PAI-1 binding to the uPA/uPA receptor complex, resulting in the latter's degradation. Thus, PAI can be said to inhibit the serine proteases tPA and uPA/urokinase, and hence is an inhibitor of fibrinolysis, the physiological process that degrades blood clots. In addition, PAI-1 inhibits the activity of matrix metalloproteinases, which play a crucial role in invasion of malignant cells through the basal lamina.

PAI-1 is mainly produced by the endothelium (cells lining blood vessels), but is also secreted by other tissue types, such as adipose tissue.

Fibrinolysis (simplified). Blue arrows denote stimulation, and red arrows inhibition.

== Role in disease ==
Congenital deficiency of PAI-1 has been reported; as fibrinolysis is not suppressed adequately, it leads to a hemorrhagic diathesis (a tendency to hemorrhage).

PAI-1 is present in increased levels in various disease states (such as a number of forms of cancer), as well as in obesity and the metabolic syndrome. It has been linked to the increased occurrence of thrombosis in patients with these conditions.

PAI-1 can induce cellular senescence. PAI-1 can also be a component of the senescence-associated secretory phenotype (SASP).

In inflammatory conditions in which fibrin is deposited in tissues, PAI-1 appears to play a significant role in the progression to fibrosis (pathological formation of connective tissue). Presumably, lower PAI levels would lead to less suppression of fibrinolysis and conversely a more rapid degradation of the fibrin.

Angiotensin II increases the synthesis of plasminogen activator inhibitor-1, so it accelerates the development of atherosclerosis.

== Pharmacology ==
- Tiplaxtinin (PAI-039) is a small molecule inhibitor that is being studied for use in the attenuation of remodeling of blood vessels, a result of arterial hypertension and activation of the renin–angiotensin system.
- Annonacinone is a naturally occurring PAI-1 inhibitor found in plants of the Annonaceae family.
- TM5441 is another small molecule PAI-1 inhibitor used in research.

== Interactions ==
Plasminogen activator inhibitor-1 has been shown to interact with ORM1.
