= Peanut agglutinin =

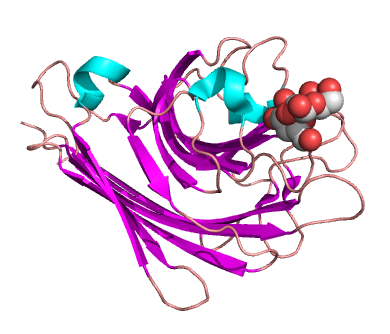
Peanut Agglutinin complexed with a di-galactose. PDB entry 2dvd

Peanut agglutinin (PNA) is plant lectin protein derived from the fruits of Arachis hypogaea. Peanut agglutinin may also be referred to as Arachis hypogaea lectin. Lectins recognise and bind particular sugar sequences in carbohydrates; peanut agglutinin binds the carbohydrate sequence Gal-β(1-3)-GalNAc. The name "peanut agglutinin" originates from its ability to stick together (agglutinate) cells, such as neuraminidase-treated erythrocytes, which have glycoproteins or glycolipids on their surface which include the Gal-β(1-3)-GalNAc carbohydrate sequence.

== Structure ==
Legume lectin domain
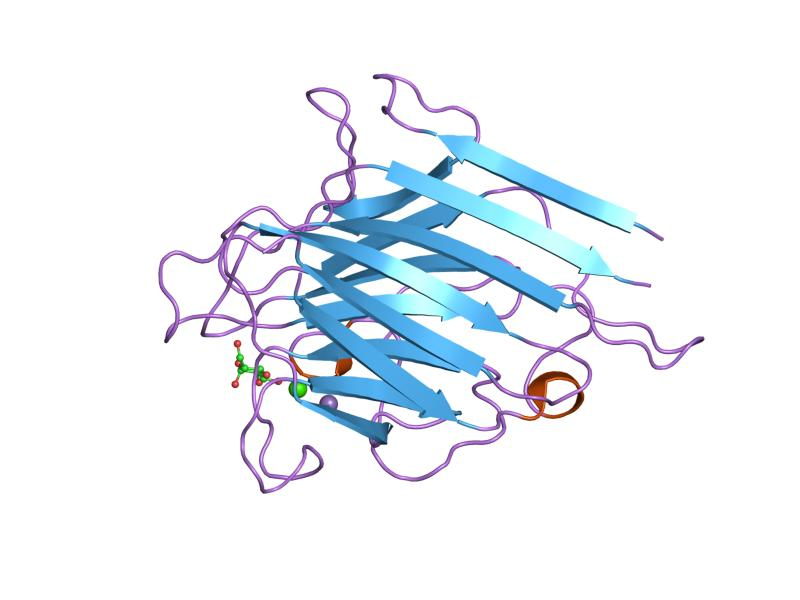
- Structure of the monosaccharide binding site of lentil lectin.

Identifiers
- Symbol: Lectin_legB
- Pfam: PF00139
- Pfam clan: CL0004
- InterPro: IPR001220
- PROSITE: PDOC00278
- SCOP2: 1lem / SCOPe / SUPFAM
Available protein structures:
- PDB: IPR001220 PF00139 (ECOD; PDBsum)
- AlphaFold: IPR001220; PF00139

The protein is 273 amino acids in length with the first 23 residues acting as a signal peptide which is subsequently cleaved. It has a Uniprot accession of P02872. There are over 20 structures of this protein in the PDB which reveal and all beta-sheet protein with a tetrameric quaternary structure. It is a member of the Lectin_legB PFAM family.

Available Structures of peanut agglutinin

== Uses in cell biology and biochemistry ==
Because peanut agglutinin specifically binds a particular carbohydrate sequence it finds use in a range of methods for cell biology and biochemistry. For example in PNA-affinity chromatography the binding specificity of peanut agglutinin is used to isolate glycosylated molecules which have the sugar sequence Gal-β(1-3)-GalNAc. Peanut agglutinin activity is inhibited by lactose and galactose which compete for the binding site.

Other uses include:

- Potent anti-T cell activity.
- Distinguishing between human lymphocyte subsets.
- Identification of cone cell inner and outer segments and to a lesser extent rod cell inner segments in the mammalian retina.
- Tumour tissue determination for transitional mucosa malignancies.
- Identification of mammalian-infective metacyclic promastigote Leishmania major parasites from other life cycle forms also found in the sandfly host.
- Identification of the outer acrosome membrane in sperm, indicating acrosome integrity.

== See also ==
- List of histologic stains that aid in diagnosis of cutaneous conditions
