= Urokinase =

Human protein

PLAU

Identifiers
- Aliases: PLAU, ATF, BDPLT5, QPD, UPA, URK, u-PA, plasminogen activator, urokinase
- External IDs: OMIM: 191840; MGI: 97611; GeneCards: PLAU
Available structures
PDB	Ortholog search: PDBe RCSB
PDB	List of PDB id codes 1C5W, 1C5X, 1C5Y, 1C5Z, 1EJN, 1F5K, 1F5L, 1F92, 1FV9, 1GI7, 1GI8, 1GI9, 1GJ7, 1GJ8, 1GJ9, 1GJA, 1GJB, 1GJC, 1GJD, 1KDU, 1LMW, 1O3P, 1O5A, 1O5B, 1O5C, 1OWD, 1OWE, 1OWH, 1OWI, 1OWJ, 1OWK, 1SC8, 1SQA, 1SQO, 1SQT, 1U6Q, 1VJA, 1W0Z, 1W10, 1W11, 1W12, 1W13, 1W14, 2FD6, 2NWN, 2O8T, 2O8U, 2O8W, 2R2W, 2VIN, 2VIO, 2VIP, 2VIQ, 2VIV, 2VIW, 2VNT, 3BT1, 3BT2, 3IG6, 3KGP, 3KHV, 3KID, 3M61, 3MHW, 3MWI, 3OX7, 3OY5, 3OY6, 3QN7, 3U73, 4DVA, 4DW2, 4FU7, 4FU8, 4FU9, 4FUB, 4FUC, 4FUD, 4FUE, 4FUF, 4FUG, 4FUH, 4FUI, 4FUJ, 4GLY, 4H42, 4JK5, 4JK6, 1URK, 4JNI, 4JNL, 4K24, 4MNV, 4MNW, 4MNX, 4MNY, 4OS1, 4OS2, 4OS4, 4OS5, 4OS6, 4OS7, 4X1N, 4X1Q, 4X1R, 4ZHL, 4ZHM, 4X0W, 4X1P, 4XSK, 4X1S, 5HGG, 4ZKO, 2I9B, 4ZKR, 4ZKS, 2I9A, 4ZKN
Enzyme activity
EC #	BRENDA	ExPASy	KEGG	MetaCyc
3.4.21.73	↗	↗	↗	↗

Gene location (Human)
Chr.	Chromosome 10 (human)
Band	10q22.2	Start	73,909,177 bp
Band	10q22.2	End	73,917,496 bp

Gene location (Mouse)
Chr.	Chromosome 14 (mouse)
Band	14 A3|14 11.53 cM	Start	20,886,728 bp
Band	14 A3|14 11.53 cM	End	20,893,453 bp
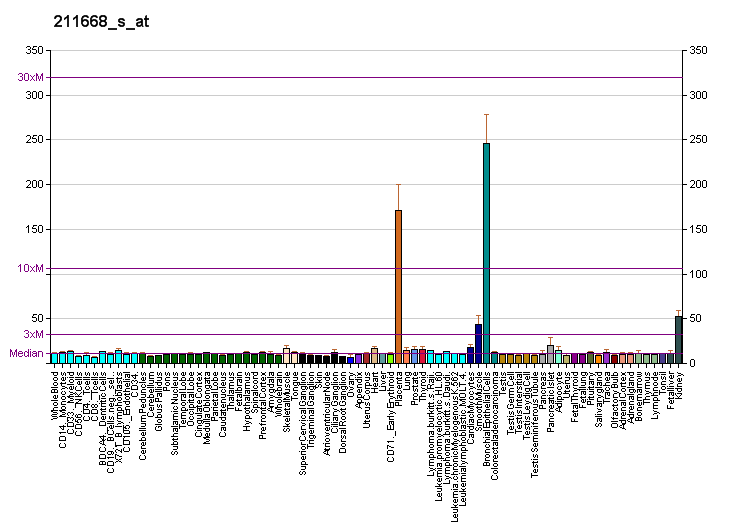
RNA expression pattern
Bgee	Human / Mouse (ortholog); Top expressed in: renal medulla; stromal cell of endometrium; islet of Langerhans; cartilage tissue; gallbladder; vena cava; right coronary artery; spleen; placenta; tendon of biceps brachii / Top expressed in: granulocyte; muscle of thigh; right kidney; outer renal medulla; proximal tubule; inner stripe of outer renal medulla; lip; yolk sac; distal tubule; trophoblast giant cell; More reference expression data
BioGPS	More reference expression data
Gene ontology
Molecular function	peptidase activity; hydrolase activity; serine-type peptidase activity; protein binding; serine-type endopeptidase activity
Cellular component	extracellular exosome; extracellular region; focal adhesion; cell surface; plasma membrane; extracellular space; specific granule membrane; tertiary granule membrane
Biological process	response to hypoxia; signal transduction; regulation of cell population proliferation; smooth muscle cell migration; regulation of wound healing; chemotaxis; regulation of cell adhesion mediated by integrin; regulation of smooth muscle cell migration; regulation of signaling receptor activity; hemostasis; regulation of smooth muscle cell-matrix adhesion; fibrinolysis; blood coagulation; positive regulation of cell migration; neutrophil degranulation; plasminogen activation; proteolysis
Sources:Amigo / QuickGO
Orthologs
Databases	NCBI: entry; OMA: entry
Species	Human	Mouse
Entrez	5328	18792
Ensembl	ENSG00000122861	ENSMUSG00000021822
UniProt	P00749	P06869
RefSeq (mRNA)	NM_001145031; NM_002658; NM_001319191	NM_008873
RefSeq (protein)	NP_001138503; NP_001306120; NP_002649	NP_032899
Location (UCSC)	Chr 10: 73.91 – 73.92 Mb	Chr 14: 20.89 – 20.89 Mb
PubMed search
- Wikidata
View/Edit Human	View/Edit Mouse

Urokinase
Clinical data
- AHFS/Drugs.com: Monograph
- ATC code: B01AD04 (WHO)

Identifiers
- CAS Number: 9039-53-6
- DrugBank: DB00013
- ChemSpider: none
- UNII: 83G67E21XI
- KEGG: D03341
- ChEMBL: ChEMBL1201420

Chemical and physical data
- Formula: C_{1376}H_{2145}N_{383}O_{406}S_{18}
- Molar mass: 31126.65 g·mol^{−1}

Urokinase, also known as urokinase-type plasminogen activator (uPA), is a serine protease present in humans and other animals. The human urokinase protein was discovered, but not named, by McFarlane and Pilling in 1947. Urokinase was originally isolated from human urine, and it is also present in the blood and in the extracellular matrix of many tissues. The primary physiological substrate of this enzyme is plasminogen, which is an inactive form (zymogen) of the serine protease plasmin. Activation of plasmin triggers a proteolytic cascade that, depending on the physiological environment, participates in thrombolysis or extracellular matrix degradation. This cascade had been involved in vascular diseases and cancer progression.

Urokinase is encoded in humans by the PLAU gene, which stands for "plasminogen activator, urokinase". The same symbol represents the gene in other animal species.

== Function ==
The PLAU gene encodes a serine protease (EC 3.4.21.73) involved in the degradation of the extracellular matrix and possibly tumor cell migration and proliferation. A specific polymorphism in this gene may be associated with late-onset Alzheimer disease and also with decreased affinity for fibrin-binding. The protein encoded by this gene converts plasminogen to plasmin by specific cleavage of an Arg-Val bond in plasminogen. This gene's proprotein is cleaved at a Lys-Ile bond by plasmin to form a two-chain derivative in which a single disulfide bond connects the amino-terminal A-chain to the catalytically active, carboxy-terminal B-chain. This two-chain derivative is also called HMW-uPA (high molecular weight uPA). HMW-uPA can be further processed into LMW-uPA (low molecular weight uPA) by cleavage of chain A into a short chain A (A1) and an amino-terminal fragment. LMW-uPA is proteolytically active but does not bind to the uPA receptor.

== Structure ==
Urokinase is a 411-residue protein, consisting of three domains: the serine protease domain (consisting of residues 159–411), the kringle domain (consisting of residues 50-131), and the EGF-like domain (consisting of residues 1-49). The kringle domain and the serine protease domain are connected by an interdomain linker or connecting peptide (consisting of residues 132–158). Urokinase is synthesized as a zymogen form (prourokinase or single-chain urokinase), and is activated by proteolytic cleavage between Lys158 and Ile159. The two resulting chains are kept together by a disulfide bond between Cys148 and Cys279.

In comparison to the mammalian system, zebrafish (Danio rerio) contains two orthologs of urokinase which have been characterised as zfuPA-a and zfuPA-b. zfuPA-a differs from the mammalian uPA by lacking an exon sequence encoding for the uPAR (urokinase receptor) binding domain; while the zfuPA-b lacks two cysteines of the epidermal growth factor-like domain. zfuPA-b also has no binding activity in fish white blood cells or fish cell lines. The uPAR binding in mammalian system is essential for the activity of urokinase and uPAR as it also functions as an adhesion receptor due to its affinity to vitronectin, integrins and other proteases like PAI-1. The lack of the uPAR binding region in zebrafish uPA, suggests that zebrafish uPA functions without uPAR binding.

== Interaction partners ==
The most important inhibitors of urokinase are the serpins plasminogen activator inhibitor-1 (PAI-1) and plasminogen activator inhibitor-2 (PAI-2), which inhibit the protease activity irreversibly. In the extracellular matrix, urokinase is tethered to the cell membrane by its interaction to the urokinase receptor.

Fibrinolysis (simplified). Blue arrows denote stimulation, and red arrows inhibition.

uPa also interacts with protein C inhibitor.

zfuPA-a and zfuPA-b are poor activators of human plasminogen, while human uPA is a poor activator of salmon plasminogen. With the primary difference between the zebrafish uPA and human uPA being in the EGF domain.

== Urokinase and cancer ==
Elevated expression levels of urokinase and several other components of the plasminogen activation system are found to be correlated with tumor malignancy. It is believed that the tissue degradation following plasminogen activation facilitates tissue invasion and, thus, contributes to metastasis. Urokinase-type plasminogen activator (uPA) is more commonly associated with cancer progression than tissue plasminogen activator (tPA). This makes uPA an attractive drug target, and, so, inhibitors have been sought to be used as anticancer agents. However, incompatibilities between the human and murine systems hamper clinical evaluation of these agents. Moreover, urokinase is used by normal cells for tissue remodeling and vessel growth, which necessitates distinguishing cancer-associated urokinase features for specific targeting.

uPA breakdown of the extracellular matrix is crucial for initiating the angiogenesis which is associated with cancer growth.

uPA antigen is elevated in breast cancer tissue, which correlates with poor prognosis in breast cancer patients. For this reason, uPA can be used as a diagnostic biomarker in breast cancer.

Through its interaction with the urokinase receptor, urokinase affects several other aspects of cancer biology such as cell adhesion, migration, and cellular mitotic pathways.

As of December 7, 2012, Mesupron (upamostat), a small molecule serine protease inhibitor developed by the WILEX pharmaceutical company, has completed phase II trials. Mesupron appears to be safe when combined with chemotherapeutic drug Capecitabine for the progression-free survival in human breast cancer.

== Clinical applications ==
Urokinase is effective for the restoration of flow to intravenous catheters blocked by clotted blood or fibrin (catheter clearance). Catheters are used extensively to administer treatments to patients for such purposes as dialysis, nutrition, antibiotic treatment and cancer treatment. Approximately 25% of catheters become blocked, meaning that affected patients cannot receive treatment until the catheter has been cleared or replaced. Urokinase is also used clinically as a thrombolytic agent in the treatment of severe or massive deep venous thrombosis, peripheral arterial occlusive disease, pulmonary embolism, acute myocardial infarction (AMI, heart attack), and occluded dialysis cannulas (catheter clearance). It is also administered intrapleurally to improve the drainage of complicated pleural effusions and empyemas. Urokinase is marketed as Kinlytic (formerly Abbokinase) and competes with recombinant tissue plasminogen activator (e.g., alteplase) as a thrombolytic drug.

All plasminogen activators (urokinase, tPA) catalyze the production of plasmin, which in turn leads to the breakdown of the fibrin mesh structure in blood clots. While there are commonalities in the mode of action for urokinase and tPA, urokinase has some advantages for treatment of peripheral clots (Pulmonary Embolism, Deep Vein Thrombosis, Peripheral arterial occlusive disease).

Unlike tPA, which is activated by binding to the fibrin within clots, urokinase is not sequestered by fibrin and therefore does not specifically attack hemostatic clots. This makes urokinase less likely to break down such hemostatic clots that are essential for ongoing blood vessel repair throughout the body. Dissolution of these “good” clots can lead to serious adverse events through hemorrhagic bleeding. Years of clinical study have confirmed the safety advantage of using urokinase. Consequently, urokinase has been preferentially used in deep venous thrombosis and peripheral arterial occlusive disease where it is administered directly to the site of the clot while tPA is preferred in AMI where peripheral bleeding is a secondary consideration.

A method for the production of urokinase was patented by Evelyn Nicol in 1976 (U.S. Patent No. 3,930,944). Nicol was believed to be the first African American woman to receive a molecular biology patent.

== Society and culture ==
The presence of a fibrinolytic enzyme in human urine was reported in 1947, without a name given for such an enzyme behind its effect. In 1952 a purified form of the enzyme was extracted from human urine and named "urokinase" for "urinary kinase". The full text for this article is lost, and the only citation points to the abstract of a list of papers read at a conference in the same journal. A few other papers on the purification were published independently around the same time. By 1960, it was still unclear whether the activation of plasminogen has anything to do with a protease, but a kinase is thought to play a role regardless.
