= Thrombosis prevention =

Medical treatment to prevent clotting within blood vessels

Thrombosis prevention, thromboprophylaxis
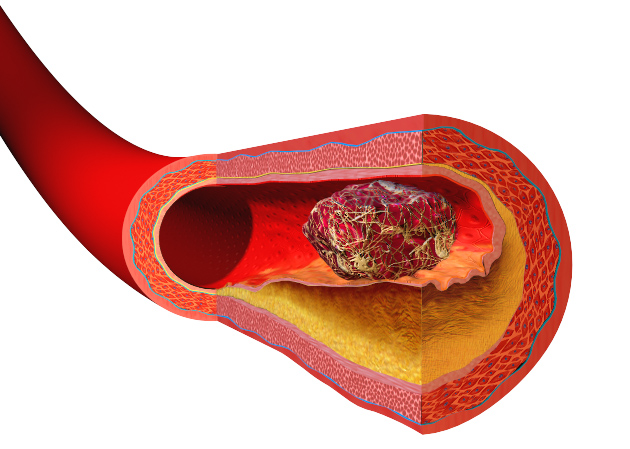
- A blood clot blocking a blood vessel.
- Other names: Thrombosis prophylaxis
- ICD-10-PCS: I80-I82
- ICD-9-CM: 437.6, 453, 671.5, 671.9

Thrombosis prevention or thromboprophylaxis is medical treatment to prevent the development of thrombosis (blood clots inside blood vessels) in those considered at risk for developing thrombosis. Some people are at a higher risk for the formation of blood clots than others, such as those with cancer undergoing a surgical procedure. Prevention measures or interventions are usually begun after surgery as the associated immobility will increase a person's risk.

Blood thinners are used to prevent clots, these blood thinners have different effectiveness and safety profiles. A 2018 systematic review found 20 studies that included 9771 people with cancer. The evidence did not identify any difference between the effects of different blood thinners on death, developing a clot, or bleeding. A 2021 review found that low molecular weight heparin (LMWH) was superior to unfractionated heparin in the initial treatment of venous thromboembolism for people with cancer.

There are medication-based interventions and non-medication-based interventions. The risk of developing blood clots can be lowered by lifestyle modifications, the discontinuation of oral contraceptives, and weight loss. In those at high risk, both interventions are often used. The treatments to prevent the formation of blood clots are balanced against the risk of bleeding.

One of the goals of blood clot prevention is to limit venous stasis as this is a significant risk factor for forming blood clots in the deep veins of the legs. Venous stasis can occur during the long periods of not moving. Thrombosis prevention is also recommended during air travel. Thrombosis prophylaxis is effective in preventing the formation of blood clots, their lodging in the veins, and their developing into thromboemboli that can travel through the circulatory system to cause blockage and subsequent tissue death in other organs. Clarence Crafoord is credited with the first use of thrombosis prophylaxis in the 1930s.

== Pathophysiology of blood clot prevention ==
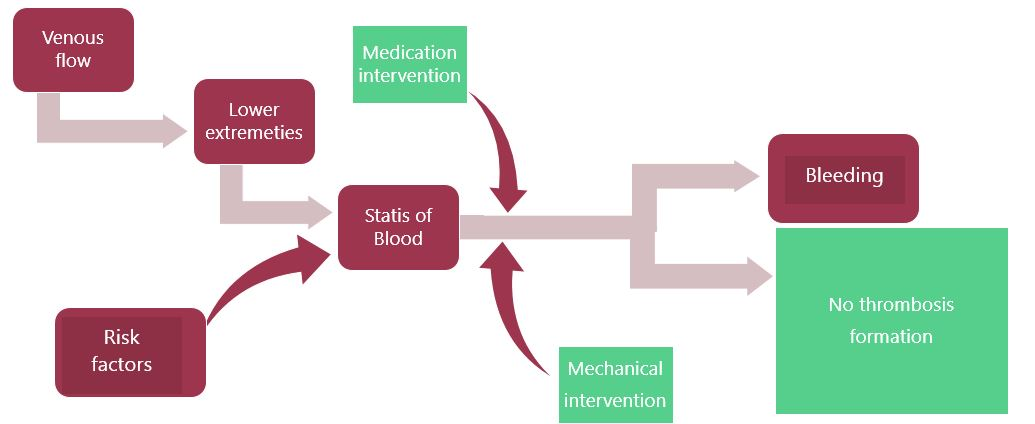

The development of blood clots can be interrupted and prevented by the use of medication, changing risk factors, and other interventions. Some risk factors can be modified. These would be losing weight, increasing exercise, and the cessation of oral contraceptives. Moving during periods of travel is a modifiable behavior. Preventing blood clots includes medications that interrupt the complex clotting cascade and changing the proteins needed for clotting. Antiplatelet drugs also have an effect in preventing the formation of clots.

== Medical treatments ==
Thrombosis prophylaxis is not only used for the prevention of deep vein thrombosis but can be initiated for the prevention of the formation of blood clots in other organs and circumstances unrelated to deep vein thrombosis:

- cerebral complications
- abortion
- ectopic pregnancy
- molar pregnancy
- pregnancy
- childbirth and the puerperium
- coronary
- portal vein thrombosis
- intracranial, nonpyogenic
- intraspinal, nonpyogenic
- mesenteric
- pulmonary

== Epidemiology of developing blood clots ==
The risk of developing deep vein thrombosis, or pulmonary embolism is different than the total risk of the formation of blood clots. This is due to the observation that not all blood clots form in the lower legs. Most hospitalized medical patients have at least 1 risk factor for thrombosis that progresses to thromboembolism and this risk persists weeks after discharge. Those who remain undiagnosed and not treated prophylactically have a 26% chance of developing a fatal embolism. Another 26% develop another embolism. Between 5% and 10% of all in-hospital deaths are due to pulmonary embolism (as a consequence of thrombosis). Estimates of the incidence of pulmonary embolism in the US is 0.1% persons/year. Hospital admissions in the US for pulmonary embolism are 200,000 to 300,000 yearly. Thrombosis that develops into DVT will affect 900,000 people and kill up to 100,000 in the US. On average 28,726 hospitalized adults aged 18 and older with a VTE blood clot diagnosis die each year. Risk of thrombosis is related to hospitalization. In 2005 the UK the Parliamentary Health Select Committee determined the annual rate of death due to thrombosis was 25,000 with at least 50% being hospital-acquired.

The type of surgery performed prior to the formation of blood clots influences the risk. Without prophylactic interventions, the calculated incidence of clot formation in the lower leg veins after surgery is:

- 22% for neurosurgery
- 26% for abdominal surgery
- 45% for 60% in orthopedic surgery
- 14% for gynecologic surgery

As the population of the US ages, the development of blood clots is becoming more common.

== General risks and indications for blood clot prevention ==
Some risk factors for developing blood clots are considered higher than others. One scoring system analyzes the probability of clot formation by assigning a point value system to significant risk factors. The benefit of treating those who are at low risk of developing blood clots may not outweigh the higher risks of significant bleeding.

Risk factors for developing blood clots that are assessed before treatments

Risk factor	Notes	References
Previous episodes of thrombosis	also a risk factor for embolism formation	
Family History of Deep Vein Thrombosis		
Gender, and race	not firmly established increased prevalence in women during childbearing years	
Smoking	modifiable, difficult	
Diabetes		
Arteriosclerosis		
Renal disease	"hypercoagulable state"	
Vasoconstriction		
Myocardial infarction and other types of heart disease	Heart attack, Unstable angina Dysrhythmias Heart failure	
Slow or turbulent blood flow	modifiable with exercise	
Stroke	heparins contraindicated	
Sedentary lifestyle	modifiable with exercise	
Plaster cast	transient	
Dehydration	modifiable also related to athletic activities and sports	
Acute respiratory failure		
Dysrhythmias		
Shock		
Obesity	modifiable	
Pregnancy and the post-partum period	"hypercoagulable state"	
Varicose veins		
Surgery	length of the surgical procedure type of operation hip or knee surgery related to subsequent state of hypercoagulability	
Lung disease		
Trauma	related to immobility	
Estrogen-based oral contraceptive	discontinuation reduces risk related to progestogen and ethinylestradiol	
Hormone replacement therapy	discontinuation reduces risk	
Ovarian hyper-stimulation therapy to treat infertility		
Compression of a vein or artery by abnormality, tumor, hematoma		
Pacing wires		
Local vein damage, incompetent valves		
Central venous catheters		
Dialysis catheters		
Repetitive motion injury		
Immobility	associated with air travel, long travel times, and post-surgical – modifiable risk	
Spinal cord injury		
Age		
Cancers		
Sepsis		
Polycythemia	heparins contraindicated	
Genetic deficiencies or autoimmune disorders, Protein C and/or S deficiency	congenital; associated with warfarin necrosis, heparins contraindicated	
Antiphospholipid antibody syndrome	altered coagulation; heparins contraindicated	
Factor V Leiden defect	altered coagulation	
Prothrombin G20210A defect	altered coagulation; heparins contraindicated	
Hyperhomocysteinimia	altered coagulation; heparins contraindicated	
Elevated factors II, VIII, IX, XI	altered coagulation; heparins contraindicated	
Antithrobin III deficiency	altered coagulation; heparins contraindicated	
Falls and hip fracture	related to immobility	
Selective estrogen-receptor modulators		
Erythropoiesis-stimulating agents		
Acute medical illness		
Inflammatory bowel disease		
Nephrotic syndrome		
Myeloproliferative disorders		
Paroxysmal nocturnal hemoglobinnuria		
Thrombophilias	heparins contraindicated	
Post-menopausal hormone replacement therapy	discontinuation reduces risk	
Right heart failure		
Venous inflammation/phlebitis	when a thrombus forms, it is thrombophlebitis	
Sickle cell disease		
Artificial heart valves		

Probability and risk estimation for developing blood clots
Major risk (=1 point)	Minor risk (=2 points)
Cancer	Family history of deep vein thrombosis
Immobility	Hospitalization within the past 6 months
Calf swelling	superficial vein dilation
Recent major surgery	redness of area
Edema or swelling of only leg	Recent trauma to leg
Tenderness in the calf and/or thigh	

Scoring of the risks associated with the formation of blood clots
Probability determination and scoring
High probability scoring (12–7 points
3 major points OR
2 major points AND >2 minor points
Low probability scoring (3–5 points)
0 major points AND > 2 minor points
1 major point AND >2 minor points
0 major points and >3 minor point
1 major point and more than one minor point
Moderate probability scoring (varies)
all other risk combinations

== Risk for subsequent blood clots ==
Developing blood clots is more probable after the first episode. Risk assessment and intervention for those with one or more episodes of deep vein thrombosis or blood clots in the veins utilize the Well's test. It has been inconsistently modified by several publishers with the results listed below:

=== Well's and modified Well's risk scoring ===
Well's and modified Well's scoring
Finding	points	references
D-dimer abonormal one month after stopping anticoagulants	2	
Age > or = to 50	1	
male	1	
use of hormone at DVT onset	1	

=== Adapted for the emergency department ===
modified Well's scoring
Finding	points	references
Malignancy	1	
Age > or = to 50	1	
cast on lower leg/Paralysis/paresis/	1	
Recent surgery or immobility	1	
tenderness over deep vein	1	
entire leg swollen	1	
difference of 3 cm between legs	1	
pitting edema of the affected leg	1	
Collateral superficial veins	1	
another diagnosis more probable than DVT	−2	

Scoring:

- less than 2 points – low risk (3%)
- 2–6 points moderate risk (17%)
- > 6 points high risk (75%)

== General interventions ==
The Centers for Disease Control and Prevention have issued general guidelines describing the interventions that can be taken to reduce the risk of the formation of blood clots:

The Centers for Disease Control and Prevention recommend the following:

- Move around as soon as possible after being confined to bed, such as after surgery, illness, or injury.
- If you're at risk for DVT, talk to your doctor about:
  - Graduated compression stockings (sometimes called "medical compression stockings")
  - Medication (anticoagulants) to prevent DVT.
- When sitting for long periods, such as when traveling for more than four hours:
  - Get up and walk around every 2 to 3 hours.
  - Exercise your legs while you're sitting by:
    - Raising and lowering your heels while keeping your toes on the floor
    - Raising and lowering your toes while keeping your heels on the floor
    - Tightening and releasing your leg muscles
  - Wear loose-fitting clothes.
- You can reduce your risk by maintaining a healthy weight, avoiding a sedentary lifestyle, and following your doctor's recommendations based on your individual risk factors.

A lower leg vein with good flow. Statis of blood would occur if this vein was compressed and blood flow decreased or was stopped.

=== Interventions during travel ===
Seat-edge pressure from the seat on an airplane on the popliteal area may contribute to vessel wall damage as well as venous stasis. Coagulation activation may result from an interaction between cabin conditions (such as hypobaric hypoxia) and individual risk factors for the formation of blood clots. Studies of the pathophysiologic mechanisms for the increased risk of venous thromboembolism or VTE after long-distance travel have not produced consistent results, but venous stasis appears to play a major role; other factors specific to air travel may increase coagulation activation, particularly in passengers with individual risk factors for VTE.

=== Interventions for those hospitalized ===
==== Compression devices ====
Mechanical compression devices are used to prevent thrombosis and are beneficial enough to be used by patients at low to moderate risk. The use of fitted intermittent pneumatic compression devices before, during, and after procedures is used in inpatient settings. It consists of an air pump and inflatable auxiliary compartments that sequentially inflate and deflate to provide an external 'pump' that returns venous blood toward the heart. The use of intermittent pneumatic compression is common. These devices are also placed on a surgical patient in the operating room (the intra-surgical period) and remain on the person while recovering from the surgery.

The application of antiembolism stockings can be used to prevent thrombosis. The correct use and properly fitted graded compression stockings can reduce the rate of thrombosis by 50%. Contraindications for the use of antiembolism stockings include the presence of advanced peripheral and obstructive arterial disease, septic phlebitis, heart failure, open wounds, dermatitis and peripheral neuropathy. Differences between the use of thigh-high compression stockings and shorter types to prevent blood clots exist, but remain inconsistent.

=== Assessment ===
There has been some success in preventing blood clots through an early risk assessment upon hospital admission, a strategy recognized by the Centers for Disease Control and Prevention. Hospitals that have participated in this effort to reduce the incidence of thrombosis found that rates of DVT decreased in some instances. Some hospitals developed a mandatory assessment quantifying the risk of developing blood clots and a plan of care developed from the results. The person's risk for developing blood clots is entered into their record, 'following' them through their treatment regime. If the hospital stay exceeds three days, the person will be reassessed for risk. Clinicians can then apply protocols for prevention based on best clinical practices.

==== Interventions to treat immobility ====
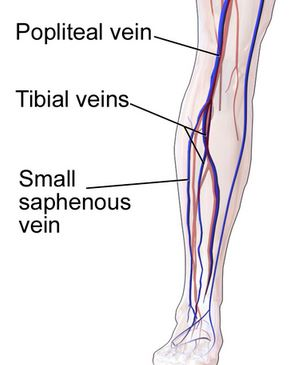
The poplitial vein can be one site of venous stasis in the lower leg. Obstruction of this vein during travel contributes to stasis.

Immobility is a significant risk factor in the development of thrombosis. Immediate post-surgical interventions, such as out of bed orders (OOB), are typically ordered by the physician to prevent thrombosis. These orders, typically delegated to a nurse, but may include the participation of a physical therapist and others trained to perform the intervention, are to perform range of motion (ROM) activities that include: muscle contractions of the lower legs for those who are very weak, moving the feet, wiggling the toes, bending the knees, raise and lower the legs. In addition, changes in positioning prevent immobility and shift areas of venous stasis. If the person is too weak to perform these preventative activities, hospital personnel will perform these movements independently. Exercise of the lower extremities is a post-operative method of prophylaxis. Nursing personnel will often perform a range of motion exercises and encourage frequent moving of the legs, feet, and ankles. Frequent positioning changes and adequate fluid intake. After a surgical procedure, ambulation as soon as possible is prophylactic in preventing the formation of blood clots.

Early ambulation also prevents venous stasis and physicians order OOB activities on the same day of surgery. This is accomplished in increments. The progression of increasing mobility proceeds by: raising the head of the bed, sitting up in bed, moving to the edge of the bed, dangling the legs off the bed, and then ambulating to a closed chair.

Patient education and compliance reduce the risk of developing blood clots. These exercises and the use of equipment and follow-up by clinicians reduce the risk of developing blood clots.

If a blood clot has already formed in the deep veins of the leg, early movement out of bed is usually prescribed, except in some severe cases of deep vein thrombosis or in people who have phlegmasia cerulea dolens. The treatment to prevent blood with physical intervention (e.g., sequential compression device) is contraindicated.

== Medication ==
=== Anticoagulants and antiplatelets ===
Thromboprophylaxis, such as anticoagulants or perioperative heparin, is effective for hospitalized patients at risk for VTE. Extended use of low molecular weight heparin (LMWH) for at least 14 days after abdominal or pelvic surgery was shown to reduce the risk of venous thromboembolism without increasing bleeding complications or mortality.

Additional risk factors, such as obesity, disease, malignancies, long surgeries, and immobility, may influence the prescribed dosage. Anticoagulant medications are used to prevent the formation of blood clots in people who are at high risk for their development.

The list below describes some of the more common medications used to prevent blood clots. Note that generally since blood clotting is inhibited, a side effect typically is increased bleeding, though it can be reversed by administering a medication that stops the bleeding or by discontinuation of the medication itself. Anticoagulant administration is often given before the start of the operation. Medications that inhibit blood clot formation include:

Medications used to prevent blood clots

Name of medication	Therapeutic/pharmacologic class	Action	Route	Other uses	Notes	Side effects	References
aspirin		antiplatelet				risks for GI tract bleeding and hemorrhagic stroke	
dipyridamole	platelet aggregation inhibitor		oral or intravenous			Abdominal or stomach cramps, diarrhea, dizziness or lightheadedness	
clopidogrel	antiplatelet						
ticlid							
enoxaparin	anticoagulant	activation of antiprothrombin, prevents fibrin formation	slow IV		platelet count is monitored		
dalteparin	anticoagulant	activation of antiprothrombin, prevents fibrin formation	IV				
fondaparinux	anticoagulant	inhibits thrombin production	injection		aspirin not recommended with this medication		
dabigatran		inhibits prothrombin					
bivalirudin		inhibits prothrombin			often given with aspirin		
argatroban	anticoagulant	inhibits prothrombin	IV		alternative to heparin in those developing heparin-induced thrombocytopenia		
desirudin	anticoagulant	inhibits prothombin	injection		used with hip replacement		
Eptifibatide	antiplatelet						
tirofiban	antiplatelet						
ticlopidine	antiplatelet						
pentoxifylline	antiplatelet						
cilostazol	antiplatelet						
rivaroxaban		inhibits factor Xa			use with antiplatelets cautioned	GI bleeding	
warfarin	anticoagulant	Thrombin inhibitor;	IV				
lipirudin	anticoagulant	inhibits prothrombin	IV		treatment may extend to 10 days		
dextran							

=== Heparins ===
Adding heparin to the use of compression stockings may prevent thrombosis for those at higher risk.

Heparin Prophylaxis
name	action	structure	references
Low-molecular weight heparin (example: Reviparin)			

The discontinuation of contraceptives also prevents blood clots.

==== Herbal interactions ====
The therapeutic effects of warfarin may be decreased by valerian. Chamomile can affect the action of anticoagulants. Dong quai, garlic, ginger, Ginkgo biloba, bilberry, and feverfew can increase bleeding time. These same herbal supplements taken with warfarin increased prothrombin time.

==== Dietary interactions ====
By containing significant content of vitamin K, some foods act as antagonists to antiplatelet and anticoagulant medications; these include green leafy vegetables, like spinach, legumes, and broccoli.

==== Contraindications ====
Preventing blood clots with medication is not considered safe in the following circumstances:

- uncooperative patient
- recent childbirth
- gastrointestinal bleeding
- reproductive system
  bleeding
- genitourinary system
  bleeding
- hemorrhagic blood dyscrasias
- peptic ulcers
- alcohol use disorder
- infection
- eye surgery
- brain surgery
- spinal cord surgery
- recent intracranial hemorrhage

== Research ==
An international registry and risk assessment calculator is being used to centralize data on post-surgical venous thrombosis and its prevention. Hospitals are implementing a multidisciplinary approach to prevent of blood clots. This includes adequate assessment of the risks, follow-up on missed doses of medication, and instituting a 'patient-centered' approach endorsed by the Joint Commission. Recommendations regarding the prevention of blood clots vary widely between clinicians and treatment facilities. Research continues to clarify these discrepancies. The metabolic state of hypercoagulability (the tendency to form blood clots) tests are being developed. These include the evaluation of the thrombin–antithrombin complexes (TAT), low levels of the anticoagulants ATIII and protein C, but these tests are not yet widely available.
