= Semuloparin sodium =

Chemical compound

Clinical data
- Other names: AVE-5026
- ATC code: None

Legal status
- Legal status: Investigational

Identifiers
- CAS Number: 9041-08-1
- ChemSpider: none
- UNII: V5T10N50RD
- ECHA InfoCard: 100.110.590

Chemical and physical data
- Molar mass: 2000–3000 g/mol (average)

Semuloparin (INN, USAN) is an experimental antithrombotic being developed by Sanofi-Aventis and belongs to the group of low molecular weight heparins (LMWH). It has completed Phase III clinical trials for the prevention of thromboembolism following various kinds of surgery such as hip replacement, as well as for patients undergoing chemotherapy.

Like bemiparin, semuloparin is classified as an ultra-LMWH because of its low molecular mass of 2000–3000 g/mol on average. (Enoxaparin has 4500 g/mol) These heparins have lower anti-thrombin activity than classical LMWHs and act mainly on factor Xa, reducing the risk of bleeding.
