= Hypercoagulability in pregnancy =

- Specialty: Obstetrics

Hypercoagulability in pregnancy is the propensity of pregnant women to develop thrombosis (blood clots). Pregnancy itself is a factor of hypercoagulability (pregnancy-induced hypercoagulability), as a physiologically adaptive mechanism to prevent post partum bleeding. However, when combined with an additional underlying hypercoagulable states, the risk of thrombosis or embolism may become substantial.

== Causes ==
Pregnancy-induced hypercoagulability is probably a physiologically adaptive mechanism to prevent post partum hemorrhage. Pregnancy changes the plasma levels of many clotting factors, such as fibrinogen, which can rise up to three times its normal value. Thrombin levels increase. Protein S, an anticoagulant, decreases. However, the other major anticoagulants, protein C and antithrombin III, remain constant. Fibrinolysis is impaired by an increase in plasminogen activator inhibitor-1 (PAI-1 or PAI) and plasminogen activator inhibitor-2 (PAI-2), the latter synthesized from the placenta. Venous stasis may occur at the end of the first trimester, due to enhanced compliance of the vessel walls by a hormonal effect.

Also, pregnancy can cause hypercoagulability by other factors, e.g. the prolonged bed rest that often occurs post partum that occurs in case of delivery by forceps, vacuum extractor or Caesarean section.

A study of more than 200,000 women came to the result that admission to inpatient care during pregnancy was associated with an 18-fold increase in the risk of venous thromboembolism (VTE) during the stay, and a 6-fold increase in risk in the four weeks after discharge, compared with pregnant women who did not require hospitalization. The study included women admitted to hospital for one or more days for reasons other than delivery or venous thromboembolism.

Pregnancy after the age of 35 augments the risk of VTE, as does multigravidity of more than four pregnancies.

Pregnancy in itself causes approximately a five-fold increased risk of deep venous thrombosis. Several pregnancy complications, such as pre-eclampsia, cause substantial hypercoagulability.

Hypercoagulability states as a pre-existing condition in pregnancy include both acquired ones, such as antiphospholipid antibodies, and congenital ones, including factor V Leiden, prothrombin mutation, proteins C and S deficiencies, and antithrombin III deficiency.

== Complications ==
Hypercoagulability in pregnancy, particularly due to inheritable thrombophilia, can lead to placental vascular thrombosis. This can in turn lead to complications like early-onset hypertensive disorders of pregnancy, pre-eclampsia and small for gestational age infants (SGA). Among other causes of hypercoagulability, Antiphospholipid syndrome has been associated with adverse pregnancy outcomes including recurrent miscarriage. Deep vein thrombosis has an incidence of one in 1,000 to 2,000 pregnancies in the United States, and is the second most common cause of maternal death in developed countries after bleeding.

== Prevention ==
Unfractionated heparin, low molecular weight heparin, warfarin (not to be used during pregnancy) and aspirin remain the basis of antithrombotic treatment and prophylaxis both before and during pregnancy.

While the consensus among physicians is the safety of the mother supersedes the safety of the developing fetus, changes in the anticoagulation regimen during pregnancy can be performed to minimize the risks to the developing fetus while maintaining therapeutic levels of anticoagulants in the mother.

The main issue with anticoagulation in pregnancy is that warfarin, the most commonly used anticoagulant in chronic administration, is known to have teratogenic effects on the fetus if administered in early pregnancy. Still, there seems to be no teratogenic effect of warfarin before six weeks of gestation. However, unfractionated heparin and low molecular weight heparin do not cross the placenta.

=== Indications ===
In general, the indications for anticoagulation during pregnancy are the same as the general population. This includes (but is not limited to) a recent history of deep venous thrombosis (DVT) or pulmonary embolism, a metallic prosthetic heart valve, and atrial fibrillation in the setting of structural heart disease.

In addition to these indications, anticoagulation may be of benefit in individuals with lupus erythematosus, individuals who have a history of DVT or PE associated with a previous pregnancy, and even with individuals with a history of coagulation factor deficiencies and DVT not associated with a previous pregnancy.

In pregnant women with a history of recurrent miscarriage, anticoagulation seems to increase the live birth rate among those with antiphospholipid syndrome and perhaps those with congenital thrombophilia but not in those with unexplained recurrent miscarriage.

=== Strategies ===
A consensus on the correct anticoagulation regimen during pregnancy is lacking. Treatment is tailored to the particular individual based on her risk of complications. Warfarin and other vitamin K-inhibiting agents are contraindicated during the first trimester of pregnancy because of the teratogenic effects, and should not be administered when the pregnancy is confirmed. Rather, women who are on chronic anticoagulation may be given the option of conversion to either unfractionated heparin or low molecular weight heparin (LMWH), such as tinzaparin, prior to a planned conception. LMWH is as safe and efficacious as unfractionated heparin. A blood test including platelets and a clotting screen should be performed prior to administration of anticoagulant regimens in pregnancy.

Subcutaneous tinzaparin may be given at doses of 175 units of antifactor Xa activity per kg, based on prepregnancy or booking weight at approximately 16 weeks, and not the current weight. While unfractionated heparin is otherwise typically given in an intravenous formulation, this is inconvenient for the prolonged period of administration required in pregnancy.

Whether warfarin can be reinitiated after the 12th week of pregnancy is unclear. In a recent retrospective analysis, resumption of warfarin after the first trimester is completed is associated with increased risk of loss of the fetus. However, this analysis included only individuals who were treated with anticoagulants for mechanical heart valves, who generally require high levels of anticoagulation.

In pregnant women with mechanical heart valves, the optimal anticoagulation regimen is particularly unclear. Anticoagulation with subcutaneous heparin in this setting is associated with a high incidence of thrombosis of the valve and death. Similar issues are likely associated with the use of enoxaparin (a LMWH) in these high-risk individuals.

=== Risk score ===
Prevention of DVT and other types of venous thrombosis may be required if certain predisposing risk factors are present. One example from Sweden is based on the point system below, where points are summed to give the appropriate prophylaxis regimen.

| Points | Risk factors |
|---|---|
| 1 point Minor factors | Heterozygous for factor V Leiden mutation; Heterozygous for factor II mutation; Overweight, in this case defined as a BMI > 28 at early pregnancy; Caesarean section; DVT heredity in a first-degree relative; Age > 40 years; Pre-eclampsia; Hyperhomocysteinemia |
| 2 points Intermediate risk factors | Protein S or protein C deficiency; Immobilization (after e.g. bone fracture or prolonged bed rest) |
| 3 points Intermediate risk factors | Homozygous for factor V Leiden mutation; Homozygous for factor II mutation |
| 4 points Severe risk factors | Previous DVT; Antiphospholipid syndrome without previous DVT; Lupus anticoagulant |
| Very high risk | Artificial heart valves; Antithrombin III deficiency; Multiple previous thromboses; Antiphospholipid syndrome with previous DVT; Previous pulmonary embolism |

After adding any risk factors together, a total of one point or less indicates no preventive action is needed. A total of two points indicates short-term prophylaxis, e.g. with LMWH, may be used in temporary risk factors, as well as administering prophylactic treatment seven days postpartum, starting a couple of hours after birth. A total of 3 points increases the necessary duration of post partum prophylaxis to six weeks.

A risk score of four points or higher means prophylaxis in the ante partum period is needed, as well as at least six weeks post partum. A previous distal DVT indicates a minimum of 12 weeks (three months) of therapeutic anticoagulation therapy. A previous proximal DVT or pulmonary embolism requires a minimum of 26 weeks (6.5 months) of therapy If the therapy duration reaches delivery time, the remaining duration may be given after delivery, possibly extending the minimum of six weeks of post partum therapy. In a very high risk, high-dose ante partum prophylaxis should be continued at least 12 weeks after delivery.

Women with antiphospholipid syndrome should have an additional low-dose prophylactic treatment of aspirin.

=== Cautions ===
All anticoagulants (including LMWH) should be used with caution in women with suspected coagulopathy, thrombocytopaenia, liver disease and nephropathy.

Major side effects of tinzaparin are osteoporosis (occurring in up to 1% of cases), thrombocytopenia (heparin-induced thrombocytopenia), haemorrhage, hair loss and drug allergy. Still, LMWHs are much less likely to cause heparin-induced thrombocytopenia than unfractionated heparin.

Regional anaesthesia is contraindicated in women on therapeutic anticoagulation, and should not be used within 24 hours of the last dose of tinzaparin.

=== Monitoring ===
Anticoagulant therapy with LMWH is not usually monitored. LMWH therapy does not affect the prothrombin time (PT) or the INR, and anti-Xa levels are not reliable. It can prolong the partial thromboplastin time (APTT) in some women, but still, the APTT is not useful for monitoring.

To check for any thrombocytopenia, platelet count should be checked prior to commencing anticoagulant therapy, then seven to ten days after commencement, and monthly thereafter. Platelet count should also be checked if unexpected bruising or bleeding occurs.

== Reversal ==
Protamine reverses the effect of unfractionated heparin, but only partially binds to and reverses LMWH. A dose of 1 mg protamine / 100 IU LMWH reverses 90% of its anti-IIa and 60% of anti-Xa activity, but the clinical effect of the residual anti-Xa activity is not known. Both anti-IIa and anti-Xa activity may return up to three hours after protamine reversal, possibly due to release of additional LMWH from depot tissues.

== See also ==
- Valvular heart disease and pregnancy
