= Bemiparin sodium =

Chemical compound

Clinical data
- Trade names: Badyket, Ivor, Hibor, Zibor, others
- AHFS/Drugs.com: International Drug Names
- Routes of administration: Subcutaneous injection (except for haemodialysis)
- ATC code: B01AB12 (WHO)

Pharmacokinetic data
- Bioavailability: 96% (estimated)
- Elimination half-life: 5–6 hours

Identifiers
- CAS Number: 9005-49-6
- DrugBank: DB09258
- ChemSpider: none
- UNII: P59JKU02CE

Chemical and physical data
- Molar mass: 3600 g/mol (average)

Bemiparin (trade names Ivor and Zibor, among others) is an antithrombotic and belongs to the group of low molecular weight heparins (LMWH).

== Medical uses ==
Bemiparin is used for the prevention of thromboembolism after surgery, and to prevent blood clotting in the extracorporeal circuit in haemodialysis.

== Contraindications ==
The medication is contraindicated in patients with a history of heparin-induced thrombocytopenia with or without disseminated intravascular coagulation; acute bleeding or risk of bleeding; injury or surgery of the central nervous system, eyes or ears; severe liver or pancreas impairment; and acute or subacute bacterial endocarditis.

== Interactions ==
No interaction studies have been conducted. Drugs that are expected to increase the risk of bleeding in combination with bemiparin include other anticoagulants, aspirin and other NSAIDs, antiplatelet drugs, and corticosteroids.

== Chemistry ==
Like semuloparin, bemiparin is classified as an ultra-LMWH because of its low molecular mass of 3600 g/mol on average. (Enoxaparin has 4500 g/mol.) These heparins have lower anti-thrombin activity than classical LMWHs and act mainly on factor Xa, reducing the risk of bleeding.
