= Heparin =

Anticoagulant

Clinical data
- Pronunciation: /ˈhɛpərɪn/ HEP-ər-in
- AHFS/Drugs.com: Monograph
- License data: US DailyMed: Heparin
- Pregnancy category: AU: C
- Routes of administration: Intravenous, subcutaneous
- ATC code: B01AB01 (WHO) C05BA03 (WHO) S01XA14 (WHO)

Legal status
- Legal status: AU: S4 (Prescription only); US: ℞-only; In general: ℞ (Prescription only)

Pharmacokinetic data
- Bioavailability: Erratic
- Metabolism: Liver
- Elimination half-life: 1.5 hours
- Excretion: Urine

Identifiers
- IUPAC name: see Heparin structure
- CAS Number: 9005-49-6; sodium: 9041-08-1
- PubChem CID: 22833565
- IUPHAR/BPS: 4214
- DrugBank: DB01109
- ChemSpider: 17216115
- UNII: T2410KM04A
- KEGG: D02956; sodium: D02112
- ChEMBL: ChEMBL526514
- CompTox Dashboard (EPA): DTXSID20872761 DTXSID301010914, DTXSID20872761
- ECHA InfoCard: 100.029.698

Chemical and physical data
- Formula: C_{12}H_{19}NO_{20}S_{3}
- Molar mass: 593.45 g·mol^{−1}
- InChI: InChI=1S/C26H41NO34S4/c1-4(28)27-7-9(30)8(29)6(2-52-63(43,44)45)53-24(7)56-15-10(31)11(32)25(58-19(15)21(36)37)55-13-5(3-62(40,41)42)14(60-64(46,47)48)26(59-22(13)38)57-16-12(33)17(61-65(49,50)51)23(39)54-18(16)20(34)35/h5-19,22-26,29-33,38-39H,2-3H2,1H3,(H,27,28)(H,34,35)(H,36,37)(H,40,41,42)(H,43,44,45)(H,46,47,48)(H,49,50,51)/t5-,6+,7+,8+,9+,10+,11+,12-,13-,14+,15-,16-,17+,18+,19-,22-,23?,24+,25+,26-/m0/s1; Key:ZFGMDIBRIDKWMY-PASTXAENSA-N

Heparin, also known as unfractionated heparin (UFH), is a medication and naturally occurring glycosaminoglycan. It is one of the most studied sulfated polysaccharides.

Heparin is a blood anticoagulant that increases the activity of antithrombin. It is used in the treatment of heart attacks and unstable angina. It can be given intravenously or by injection under the skin. Its anticoagulant properties make it useful to prevent blood clotting in blood specimen test tubes and extracorporeal circuits such as renal dialysis machines and ECMO.

Common side effects include bleeding and pain at the injection site. Heparin-induced thrombocytopenia is a less common but serious side effect. Greater care is needed in those with kidney failure.

Heparin is contraindicated for suspected cases of vaccine-induced pro-thrombotic immune thrombocytopenia (VIPIT) secondary to SARS-CoV-2 vaccination, as heparin may further increase the risk of bleeding in an anti-PF4/heparin complex autoimmune manner, in favor of alternative anticoagulant medications (such as argatroban or danaparoid).

Heparin appears to be relatively safe for use during pregnancy and breastfeeding. Heparin is produced by basophils and mast cells in all mammals.

The discovery of heparin was announced in 1916. It is on the World Health Organization's List of Essential Medicines. A fractionated version of heparin, known as low molecular weight heparin, is also available.

== Medical uses ==
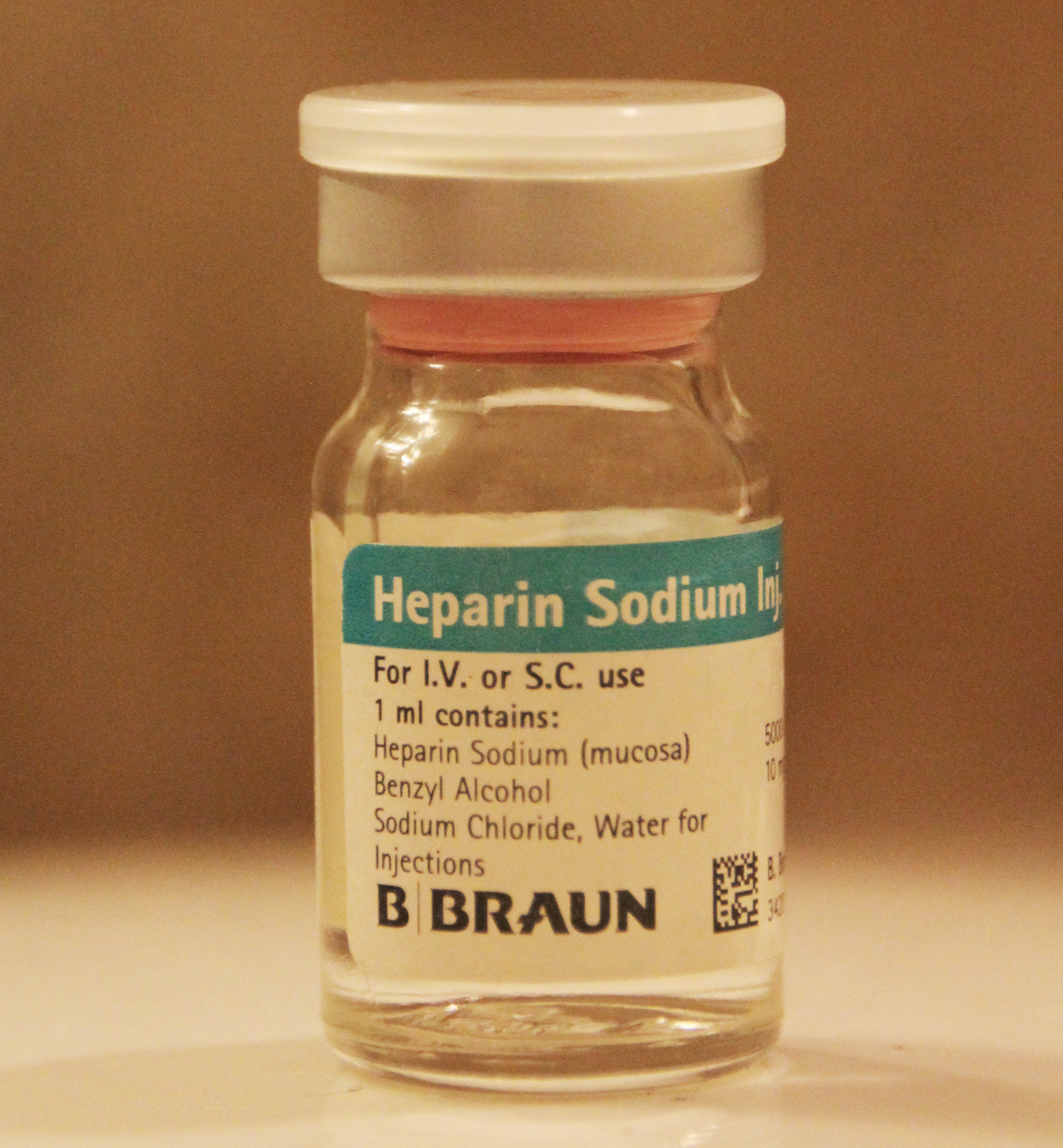
A vial of heparin sodium for injection

Heparin acts as an anticoagulant, preventing the formation of clots and extension of existing clots within the blood. Heparin itself does not break down clots that have already formed, instead, it prevents clot formation by inhibiting thrombin and other procoagulant serine proteases. Heparin is generally used for anticoagulation for the following conditions:

- Acute coronary syndrome, e.g., NSTEMI
- Atrial fibrillation
- Deep-vein thrombosis and pulmonary embolism (both prevention and treatment)
- Other thrombotic states and conditions
- Cardiopulmonary bypass for heart surgery
- ECMO circuit for extracorporeal life support
- Hemofiltration
- Indwelling central or peripheral venous catheters

Heparin and its low-molecular-weight derivatives (e.g., enoxaparin, dalteparin, tinzaparin) are effective in preventing deep vein thromboses and pulmonary emboli in people at risk, but no evidence indicates any one is more effective than the other in preventing mortality.

In angiography, 2 to 5 units/mL of unfractionated heparin saline flush is used as a locking solution to prevent the clotting of blood in guidewires, sheaths, and catheters, thus preventing thrombus from dislodging from these devices into the circulatory system .

Unfractionated heparin is used in hemodialysis. Compared to low-molecular-weight heparin, unfractionated heparin does not have prolonged anticoagulation action after dialysis and is low cost. However, the short duration of action for heparin would require it to maintain continuous infusion to maintain its action. Meanwhile, unfractionated heparin has higher risk of heparin-induced thrombocytopenia.

== Adverse effects ==
A serious side-effect of heparin is heparin-induced thrombocytopenia (HIT), caused by an immunological reaction that makes platelets a target of immunological response, resulting in the degradation of platelets, which causes thrombocytopenia. This condition is usually reversed on discontinuation, and in general can be avoided with the use of synthetic heparins. Not all patients with heparin antibodies will develop thrombocytopenia. Also, a benign form of thrombocytopenia is associated with early heparin use, which resolves without stopping heparin. Approximately one-third of patients with diagnosed heparin-induced thrombocytopenia will ultimately develop thrombotic complications.

Two non-hemorrhagic side effects of heparin treatment are known. The first is an elevation of serum aminotransferase levels, which has been reported in as many as 80% of patients receiving heparin. This abnormality is not associated with liver dysfunction, and it disappears after the drug is discontinued. The other complication is hyperkalemia, which occurs in 5 to 10% of patients receiving heparin, and is the result of heparin-induced aldosterone suppression. The hyperkalemia can appear within a few days after the onset of heparin therapy. More rarely, the side-effects alopecia and osteoporosis can occur with chronic use.

As with many drugs, overdoses of heparin can be fatal. In September 2006, heparin received worldwide publicity when three prematurely born infants died after they were mistakenly given overdoses of heparin at an Indianapolis hospital.

=== Contraindications ===
Heparin is contraindicated in those with risk of bleeding (especially in people with uncontrolled blood pressure, liver disease, and stroke), severe liver disease, or severe hypertension.

=== Antidote to heparin ===
Protamine sulfate has been given to counteract the anticoagulant effect of heparin (1 mg per 100 units of heparin that had been given over the past 6 hours). It may be used in those who overdose on heparin or to reverse heparin's effect when it is no longer needed.

== Pharmacology ==
In nature, heparin is a polymer of varying chain size. Unfractionated heparin (UFH) as a pharmaceutical is heparin that has not been fractionated to sequester the fraction of molecules with low molecular weight. In contrast, low-molecular-weight heparin (LMWH) has undergone fractionation to make its pharmacodynamics more predictable. Often either UFH or LMWH can be used; in some situations one or the other is preferable.

=== Mechanism of action ===
Heparin binds to the enzyme inhibitor antithrombin (AT), causing a conformational change that results in its activation through an increase in the flexibility of its reactive site loop. The activated AT then inactivates thrombin, factor Xa and other proteases. The rate of inactivation of these proteases by AT can increase by up to 1000-fold due to the binding of heparin. Heparin binds to AT via a specific pentasaccharide sulfation sequence contained within the heparin polymer:

GlcNAc/NS(6S)-GlcA-GlcNS(3S,6S)-IdoA(2S)-GlcNS(6S)

The conformational change in AT on heparin-binding mediates its inhibition of factor Xa. For thrombin inhibition, however, thrombin must also bind to the heparin polymer at a site proximal to the pentasaccharide. The highly negative charge density of heparin contributes to its very strong electrostatic interaction with thrombin. The formation of a ternary complex between AT, thrombin, and heparin results in the inactivation of thrombin. For this reason, heparin's activity against thrombin is size-dependent, with the ternary complex requiring at least 18 saccharide units for efficient formation. In contrast, antifactor Xa activity via AT requires only the pentasaccharide-binding site.

This size difference has led to the development of low-molecular-weight heparins (LMWHs) and fondaparinux as anticoagulants. Fondaparinux targets anti-factor Xa activity rather than inhibiting thrombin activity, to facilitate a more subtle regulation of coagulation and an improved therapeutic index. It is a synthetic pentasaccharide, whose chemical structure is almost identical to the AT binding pentasaccharide sequence that can be found within polymeric heparin and heparan sulfate.

With LMWH and fondaparinux, the risk of osteoporosis and heparin-induced thrombocytopenia (HIT) is reduced. Monitoring of the activated partial thromboplastin time is also not required and does not reflect the anticoagulant effect, as APTT is insensitive to alterations in factor Xa.

Danaparoid, a mixture of heparan sulfate, dermatan sulfate, and chondroitin sulfate can be used as an anticoagulant in patients having developed HIT. Because danaparoid does not contain heparin or heparin fragments, cross-reactivity of danaparoid with heparin-induced antibodies is reported as less than 10%.

The effects of heparin are measured in the lab by the activated partial thromboplastin time (aPTT), one of the measures of the time it takes the blood plasma to clot. Partial thromboplastin time should not be confused with prothrombin time, or PT, which measures blood clotting time through a different pathway of the coagulation cascade.

=== Administration ===
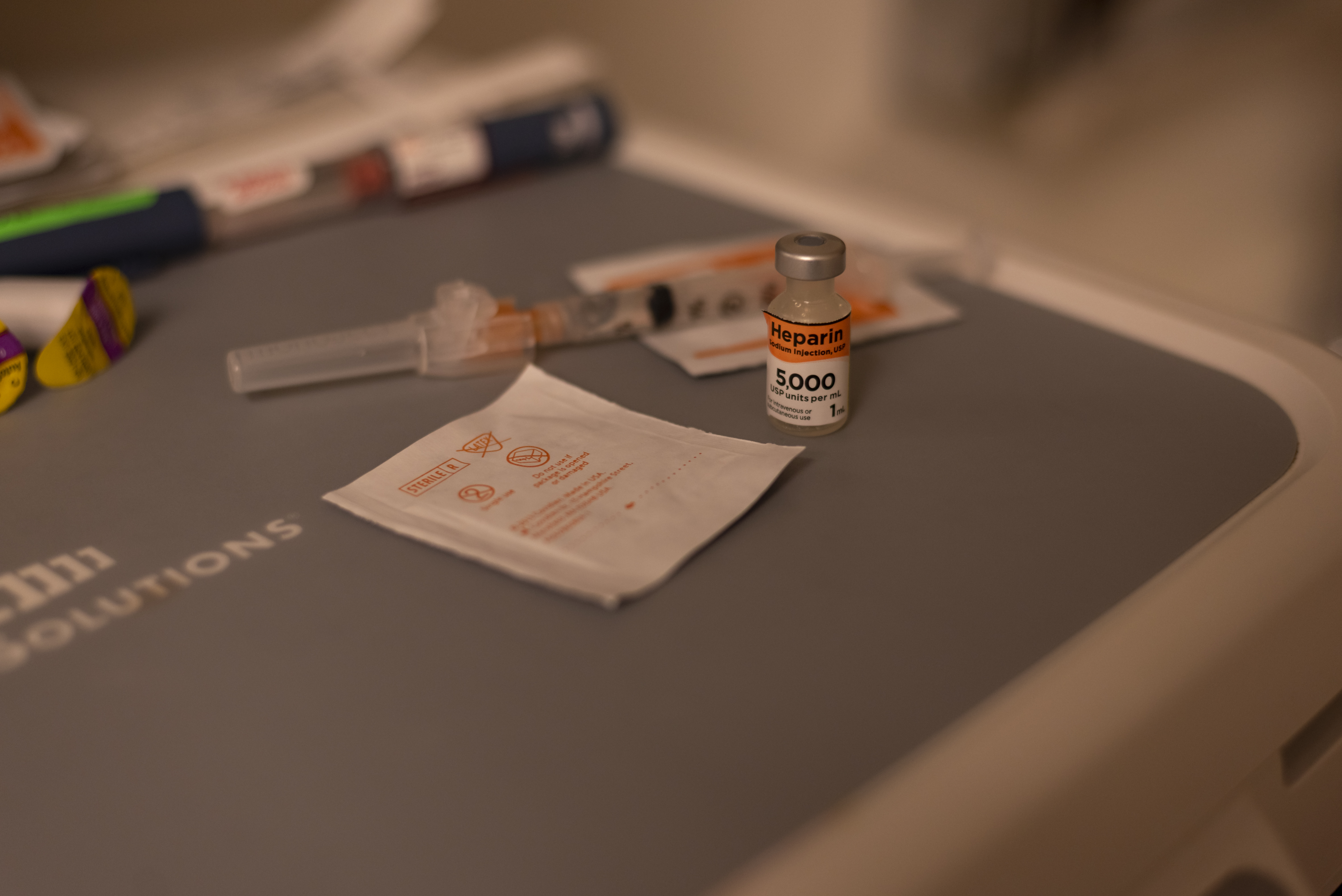
Heparin vial for subcutaneous injection

Heparin is given parenterally because it is not absorbed from the gut, due to its high negative charge and large size. It can be injected intravenously or subcutaneously (under the skin); intramuscular injections (into muscle) are avoided because of the potential for forming hematomas. Because of its short biologic half-life of about one hour, heparin must be given frequently or as a continuous infusion. Unfractionated heparin has a half-life of about one to two hours after infusion, whereas LMWH has a half-life of four to five hours. The use of LMWH has allowed once-daily dosing, thus not requiring a continuous infusion of the drug. If long-term anticoagulation is required, heparin is often used only to commence anticoagulation therapy until an oral anticoagulant e.g. warfarin takes effect.

The American College of Chest Physicians publishes clinical guidelines on heparin dosing.

=== Natural degradation or clearance ===
Unfractionated heparin has a half-life of about one to two hours after infusion, whereas low-molecular-weight heparin's half-life is about four times longer. Lower doses of heparin have a much shorter half-life than larger ones. Heparin binding to macrophage cells is internalized and depolymerized by the macrophages. It also rapidly binds to endothelial cells, which precludes the binding to antithrombin that results in anticoagulant action. For higher doses of heparin, endothelial cell binding will be saturated, such that clearance of heparin from the bloodstream by the kidneys will be a slower process.

== Chemistry ==
=== Heparin structure ===
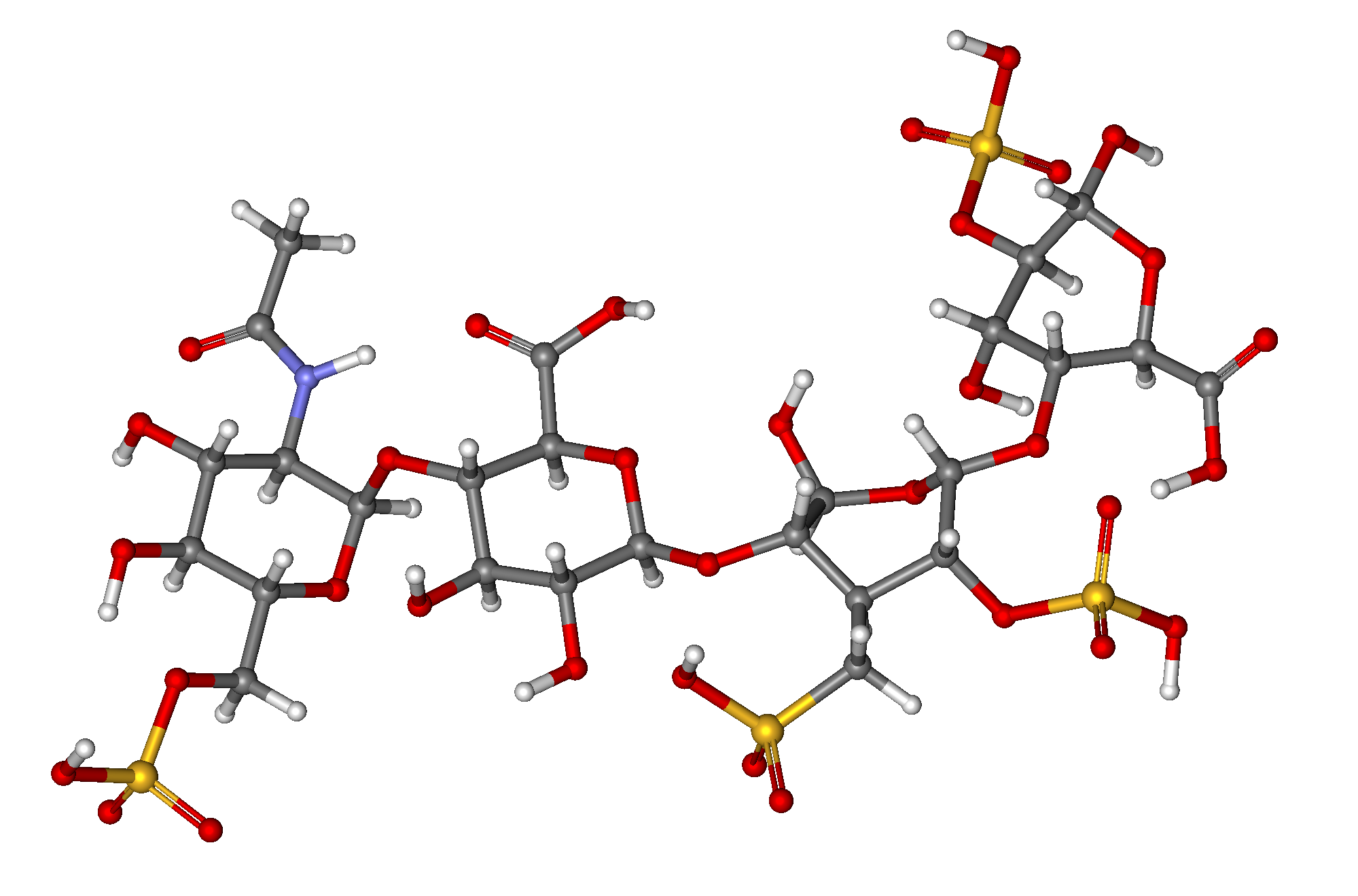
Ball-and-stick model of heparin

Native heparin is a polymer with a molecular weight ranging from 3 to 30 kDa, although the average molecular weight of most commercial heparin preparations is in the range of 12 to 15 kDa. Heparin is a member of the glycosaminoglycan family of carbohydrates (which includes the closely related molecule heparan sulfate) and consists of a variably sulfated repeating disaccharide unit. The main disaccharide units that occur in heparin are shown below. The most common disaccharide unit^{*} (see below) is composed of a 2-O-sulfated iduronic acid and 6-O-sulfated, N-sulfated glucosamine, IdoA(2S)-GlcNS(6S). For example, this makes up 85% of heparins from beef lung and about 75% of those from porcine intestinal mucosa.

Not shown below are the rare disaccharides containing a 3-O-sulfated glucosamine (GlcNS(3S,6S)) or a free amine group (GlcNH_{3}^{+}). Under physiological conditions, the ester and amide sulfate groups are deprotonated and attract positively charged counterions to form a heparin salt. Heparin is usually administered in this form as an anticoagulant.

IdoA(2S)-GlcNS(6S)^{*}

IdoA(2S)-GlcNS

IdoA-GlcNS(6S)

GlcA-GlcNAc

GlcA-GlcNS

IdoA-GlcNS

GlcA = β-D-glucuronic acid, IdoA = α-L-iduronic acid, IdoA(2S) = 2-O-sulfo-α-L-iduronic acid, GlcNAc = 2-deoxy-2-acetamido-α-D-glucopyranosyl, GlcNS = 2-deoxy-2-sulfamido-α-D-glucopyranosyl, GlcNS(6S) = 2-deoxy-2-sulfamido-α-D-glucopyranosyl-6-O-sulfate

One unit of heparin (the "Howell unit") is an amount approximately equivalent to 0.002 mg of pure heparin, which is the quantity required to keep 1 ml of cat's blood fluid for 24 hours at 0 °C.

==== Three-dimensional structure ====
The three-dimensional structure of heparin is complicated because iduronic acid may be present in either of two low-energy conformations when internally positioned within an oligosaccharide. The conformational equilibrium is influenced by the sulfation state of adjacent glucosamine sugars. Nevertheless, the solution structure of a heparin dodecasaccharide composed solely of six GlcNS(6S)-IdoA(2S) repeat units has been determined using a combination of NMR spectroscopy and molecular modeling techniques. Two models were constructed, one in which all IdoA(2S) were in the ^{2}S_{0} conformation (A and B below), and one in which they are in the ^{1}C_{4} conformation (C and D below). However, no evidence suggests that changes between these conformations occur in a concerted fashion. These models correspond to the protein data bank code 1HPN.

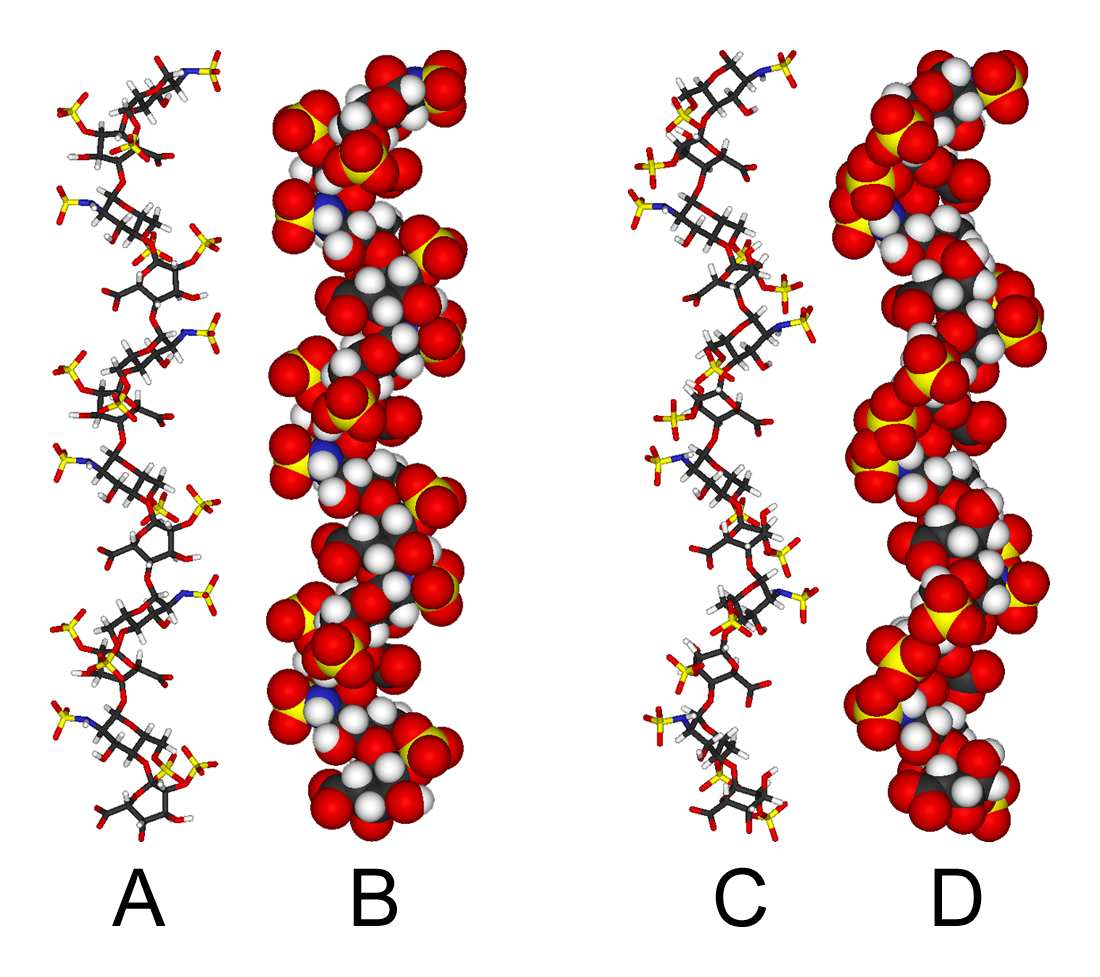
Two different structures of heparin

In the image above:

- A = 1HPN (all IdoA(2S) residues in ^{2}S_{0} conformation) Jmol viewer
- B = van der Waals radius space-filling model of A
- C = 1HPN (all IdoA(2S) residues in ^{1}C_{4} conformation) Jmol viewer
- D = van der Waals radius space-filling model of C

In these models, heparin adopts a helical conformation, the rotation of which places clusters of sulfate groups at regular intervals of about 17 angstroms (1.7 nm) on either side of the helical axis.

=== Depolymerization techniques ===
Either chemical or enzymatic depolymerization techniques or a combination of the two underlie the vast majority of analyses carried out on the structure and function of heparin and heparan sulfate (HS).

==== Enzymatic ====
The enzymes traditionally used to digest heparin or HS are naturally produced by the soil bacterium Pedobacter heparinus (formerly named Flavobacterium heparinum). This bacterium is capable of using either heparin or HS as its sole carbon and nitrogen source. To do so, it produces a range of enzymes such as lyases, glucuronidases, sulfoesterases, and sulfamidases. The lyases have mainly been used in heparin/HS studies. The bacterium produces three lyases, heparinases I (EC 4.2.2.7), II (no EC number assigned) and III (EC 4.2.2.8) and each has distinct substrate specificities as detailed below.

Heparinase enzyme	Substrate specificity
Heparinase I	GlcNS(±6S)-IdoA(2S)
Heparinase II	GlcNS/Ac(±6S)-IdoA(±2S); GlcNS/Ac(±6S)-GlcA
Heparinase III	GlcNS/Ac(±6S)-GlcA/IdoA (with a preference for GlcA)

UA(2S)-GlcNS(6S)

The lyases cleave heparin/HS by a beta-elimination mechanism. This action generates an unsaturated double bond between C4 and C5 of the uronate residue. The C4-C5 unsaturated uronate is termed ΔUA or UA. It is a sensitive UV chromophore (max absorption at 232 nm) and allows the rate of an enzyme digest to be followed, as well as providing a convenient method for detecting the fragments produced by enzyme digestion.

==== Chemical ====
Nitrous acid can be used to chemically depolymerize heparin/HS. Nitrous acid can be used at pH 1.5 or a higher pH of 4. Under both conditions, nitrous acid effects deaminative cleavage of the chain.

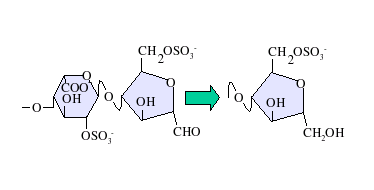
IdoA(2S)-aMan: The anhydromannose can be reduced to an anhydromannitol

At both 'high' (4) and 'low' (1.5) pH, deaminative cleavage occurs between GlcNS-GlcA and GlcNS-IdoA, albeit at a slower rate at the higher pH. The deamination reaction, and therefore chain cleavage, is regardless of O-sulfation carried by either monosaccharide unit.

At low pH, deaminative cleavage results in the release of inorganic SO_{4}, and the conversion of GlcNS into anhydromannose (aMan). Low-pH nitrous acid treatment is an excellent method to distinguish N-sulfated polysaccharides such as heparin and HS from non N-sulfated polysaccharides such as chondroitin sulfate and dermatan sulfate, chondroitin sulfate and dermatan sulfate not being susceptible to nitrous acid cleavage.

=== Detection in body fluids ===
Current clinical laboratory assays for heparin rely on an indirect measurement of the effect of the drug, rather than on a direct measure of its chemical presence. These include activated partial thromboplastin time (APTT) and antifactor Xa activity. The specimen of choice is usually fresh, nonhemolyzed plasma from blood that has been anticoagulated with citrate, fluoride, or oxalate.

== Physiological function ==
Heparin's normal role in the body is unclear. Heparin is usually stored within the secretory granules of mast cells and released only into the vasculature at sites of tissue injury. It has been proposed that rather than anticoagulation, the main purpose of heparin is defense at such sites against invading bacteria and other foreign materials. In addition, it is observed across many widely different species, including some invertebrates that do not have a similar blood coagulation system. It is a highly sulfated glycosaminoglycan and has the highest negative charge density of any known biological molecule.

=== Evolutionary conservation ===
In addition to the bovine and porcine tissue from which pharmaceutical-grade heparin is commonly extracted, it has also been extracted and characterized from:

1. Turkey
2. Whale
3. Dromedary camel
4. Mouse
5. Humans
6. Lobster
7. Fresh water mussel
8. Clam
9. Shrimp
10. Mangrove crab
11. Sand dollar
12. Atlantic salmon
13. Zebra fish

The biological activity of heparin within species 6–11 is unclear and further supports the idea that the main physiological role of heparin is not anticoagulation. These species do not possess any blood coagulation system similar to that present within the species listed 1–5. The above list also demonstrates how heparin has been highly evolutionarily conserved, with molecules of a similar structure being produced by a broad range of organisms belonging to many different phyla.

== Other functions ==
- Blood specimen test tubes, vacutainers, and capillary tubes that use the lithium salt of heparin (lithium heparin) as an anticoagulant are usually marked with green stickers and green tops. Heparin has the advantage over EDTA of not affecting levels of most ions. However, the concentration of ionized calcium may be decreased if the concentration of heparin in the blood specimen is too high. Heparin can interfere with some immunoassays, however. As lithium heparin is usually used, a person's lithium levels cannot be obtained from these tubes; for this purpose, royal-blue-topped (and dark green-topped) vacutainers containing sodium heparin are used.
- Heparin-coated blood oxygenators are available for use in heart-lung machines. Among other things, these specialized oxygenators are thought to improve overall biocompatibility and host homeostasis by providing characteristics similar to those of native endothelium.
- The DNA binding sites on RNA polymerase can be occupied by heparin, preventing the polymerase from binding to promoter DNA. This property is exploited in a range of molecular biological assays.
- Common diagnostic procedures require PCR amplification of a patient's DNA, which is easily extracted from white blood cells treated with heparin. This poses a potential problem, since heparin may be extracted along with the DNA, and it has been found to interfere with the PCR reaction at levels as low as 0.002 U in a 50 μL reaction mixture.
- Heparin has been used as a chromatography resin, acting as both an affinity ligand and an ion exchanger. Its polyanionic structure can mimic nucleic acids like DNA and RNA, making it useful for purification of nucleic acid-binding proteins including DNA and RNA polymerases and transcription factors. Heparin's specific affinity for VSV-G, a viral envelope glycoprotein often used to pseudotype retroviral and lentiviral vectors for gene therapy, allows it to be used for downstream purification of viral vectors.
- Heparin is being trialed in a nasal spray form as prophylaxis against COVID-19 infection. Furthermore, its reported from trials that due to anti-viral, anti-inflammatory and its anti-clotting effects its inhalation could improve at a 70% rate on patients that were actively struck by a COVID-19 infection.

== History ==
Heparin was discovered by Jay McLean and William Henry Howell in 1916, although it did not enter clinical trials until 1935. It was originally isolated from dog liver cells, hence its name (ἧπαρ hēpar is Greek for 'liver'; hepar + -in).

McLean was a second-year medical student at Johns Hopkins University, and was working under the guidance of Howell investigating pro-coagulant preparations when he isolated a fat-soluble phosphatide anticoagulant in canine liver tissue. In 1918, Howell coined the term 'heparin' for this type of fat-soluble anticoagulant. In the early 1920s, Howell isolated a water-soluble polysaccharide anticoagulant, which he also termed 'heparin', although it was different from the previously discovered phosphatide preparations. McLean's work as a surgeon probably changed the focus of the Howell group to look for anticoagulants, which eventually led to the polysaccharide discovery.

It had at first been accepted that it was Howell who discovered heparin. However, in the 1940s, Jay McLean became unhappy that he had not received appropriate recognition for what he saw as his discovery. Though relatively discreet about his claim and not wanting to upset his former chief, he gave lectures and wrote letters claiming that the discovery was his. This gradually became accepted as fact, and indeed after he died in 1959, his obituary credited him as being the true discoverer of heparin. This was elegantly restated in 1963 in a plaque unveiled at Johns Hopkins to commemorate the major contribution (of McLean) to the discovery of heparin in 1916 in collaboration with Professor William Henry Howell.

In the 1930s, several researchers were investigating heparin. Erik Jorpes at Karolinska Institutet published his research on the structure of heparin in 1935, which made it possible for the Swedish company Vitrum AB to launch the first heparin product for intravenous use in 1936. Between 1933 and 1936, Connaught Medical Research Laboratories, then a part of the University of Toronto, perfected a technique for producing safe, nontoxic heparin that could be administered to patients, in a saline solution. The first human trials of heparin began in May 1935, and, by 1937, it was clear that Connaught's heparin was safe, easily available, and effective as a blood anticoagulant. Before 1933, heparin was available in small amounts, was extremely expensive and toxic, and, as a consequence, of no medical value.

Heparin production experienced a break in the 1990s. Until then, heparin was mainly obtained from cattle tissue, which was a by-product of the meat industry, especially in North America. With the rapid spread of BSE, more and more manufacturers abandoned this source of supply. As a result, global heparin production became increasingly concentrated in China, where the substance was now procured from the expanding industry of breeding and slaughtering hogs. The dependence of medical care on the meat industry assumed threatening proportions in the wake of the COVID-19 pandemic. In 2020, several studies demonstrated the efficacy of heparin in mitigating severe disease progression, as its anticoagulant effect counteracted the formation of immunothrombosis. However, the availability of heparin on the world market was decreased, because concurrently a renewed swine flu epidemic had reduced significant portions of the Chinese hog population. The situation was further exacerbated by the fact that mass slaughterhouses around the world became coronavirus hotspots themselves and were forced to close temporarily. In less affluent countries, the resulting heparin shortage also led to worsened health care beyond the treatment of COVID-19, for example through the cancellation of cardiac surgeries.

== Society and culture ==
=== Contamination recalls ===
Considering the animal source of pharmaceutical heparin, the number of potential impurities is relatively large compared with a wholly synthetic therapeutic agent. The range of possible biological contaminants includes viruses, bacterial endotoxins, transmissible spongiform encephalopathy (TSE) agents, lipids, proteins, and DNA. During the preparation of pharmaceutical-grade heparin from animal tissues, impurities such as solvents, heavy metals, and extraneous cations can be introduced. However, the methods employed to minimize the occurrence and to identify and/or eliminate these contaminants are well established and listed in guidelines and pharmacopeias. The major challenge in the analysis of heparin impurities is the detection and identification of structurally related impurities. The most prevalent impurity in heparin is dermatan sulfate (DS), also known as chondroitin sulfate B. The building block of DS is a disaccharide composed of 1,3-linked N-acetyl galactosamine (GalN) and a uronic acid residue, connected via 1,4 linkages to form the polymer. DS is composed of three possible uronic acids (GlcA, IdoA, or IdoA2S) and four possible hexosamine (GalNAc, Gal- NAc4S, GalNAc6S, or GalNAc4S6S) building blocks. The presence of iduronic acid in DS distinguishes it from chondroitin sulfate A and C and likens it to heparin and HS. DS has a lower negative charge density overall compared to heparin. A common natural contaminant, DS is present at levels of 1–7% in heparin API but has no proven biological activity that influences the anticoagulation effect of heparin.

In December 2007, the US Food and Drug Administration (FDA) recalled a shipment of heparin because of bacterial growth (Serratia marcescens) in several unopened syringes of this product. S. marcescens can lead to life-threatening injuries and/or death.

==== 2008 recall due to adulteration in drug from China ====
In March 2008, major recalls of heparin were announced by the FDA due to contamination of the raw heparin stock imported from China. According to the FDA, the adulterated heparin killed nearly 80 people in the United States. The adulterant was identified as an "over-sulphated" derivative of chondroitin sulfate, a popular shellfish-derived supplement often used for arthritis, which was intended to substitute for actual heparin in potency tests.

According to the New York Times: "Problems with heparin reported to the agency include difficulty breathing, nausea, vomiting, excessive sweating and rapidly falling blood pressure that in some cases led to life-threatening shock".

=== Use in homicide ===
In 2006, Petr Zelenka, a nurse in the Czech Republic, deliberately administered large doses to patients, killing seven, and attempting to kill ten others.

=== Overdose issues ===
In 2007, a nurse at Cedars-Sinai Medical Center mistakenly gave the 12-day-old twins of actor Dennis Quaid a dose of heparin that was 1,000 times the recommended dose for infants. The overdose allegedly arose because the labeling and design of the adult and infant versions of the product were similar. The Quaid family subsequently sued the manufacturer, Baxter Healthcare Corp., and settled with the hospital for $750,000. Prior to the Quaid accident, six newborn babies at Methodist Hospital in Indianapolis, Indiana, were given an overdose. Three of the babies died after the mistake.

In July 2008, another set of twins born at Christus Spohn Hospital South, in Corpus Christi, Texas, died after an accidentally administered overdose of the drug. The overdose was due to a mixing error at the hospital pharmacy and was unrelated to the product's packaging or labeling. As of July 2008, the exact cause of the twins' death was under investigation.

In March 2010, a two-year-old transplant patient from Texas was given a lethal dose of heparin at the University of Nebraska Medical Center. The exact circumstances surrounding her death are still under investigation.

=== Production ===
Pharmaceutical-grade heparin is derived from mucosal tissues of slaughtered meat animals such as porcine (pig) intestines or bovine (cattle) lungs. Advances to produce heparin synthetically have been made in 2003 and 2008. In 2011, a chemoenzymatic process of synthesizing low molecular weight heparins from simple disaccharides was reported.

=== Research ===
As detailed in the table below, the potential is great for the development of heparin-like structures as drugs to treat a wide range of diseases, in addition to their current use as anticoagulants.

Disease states sensitive to heparin	Heparin's effect in experimental models	Clinical status
Acquired immunodeficiency syndrome	Reduces the ability of human immunodeficiency virus types 1 and 2 to adsorb to cultured T4 cells.	–
Acute respiratory distress syndrome	Reduces cell activation and accumulation in airways, neutralizes mediators and cytotoxic cell products, and improves lung function in animal models	Controlled clinical trials
Allergic encephalomyelitis	Effective in animal models	–
Allergic rhinitis	Effects as for acute respiratory distress syndrome, although no specific nasal model has been tested	Controlled clinical trial
Arthritis	Inhibits cell accumulation, collagen destruction and angiogenesis	Anecdotal report
Asthma	As for acute respiratory distress syndrome, however, it has also been shown to improve lung function in experimental models	Controlled clinical trials
Cancer	Inhibits tumour growth, metastasis and angiogenesis, and increases survival time in animal models	Several anecdotal reports
Delayed-type hypersensitivity reactions	Effective in animal models	–
Inflammatory bowel disease	Inhibits inflammatory cell transport in general, no specific model tested	Controlled clinical trials
Interstitial cystitis	Effective in a human experimental model of interstitial cystitis	Related molecule now used clinically
Transplant rejection	Prolongs allograft survival in animal models	–

– indicates that no information is available

As a result of heparin's effect on such a wide variety of disease states, a number of drugs are indeed in development whose molecular structures are identical or similar to those found within parts of the polymeric heparin chain.

Drug molecule	Effect of new drug compared to heparin	Biological activities
Heparin tetrasaccharide	Nonanticoagulant, nonimmunogenic, orally active	Antiallergic
Pentosan polysulfate	Plant-derived, little anticoagulant activity, anti-inflammatory, orally active	Anti-inflammatory, antiadhesive, antimetastatic
Phosphomannopentanose sulfate	Potent inhibitor of heparanase activity	Antimetastatic, antiangiogenic, anti-inflammatory
Selectively chemically O-desulphated heparin	Lacks anticoagulant activity	Anti-inflammatory, antiallergic, antiadhesive
