= Acetylsalicylic acid/dipyridamole =

Pharmaceutical combination

Combination of
- Acetylsalicylic acid: Anticoagulant
- Dipyridamole: Anticoagulant

Clinical data
- Trade names: Aggrenox, others
- AHFS/Drugs.com: UK Drug Information
- Routes of administration: Oral
- ATC code: B01AC30 (WHO)

Identifiers
- CAS Number: 50-78-2; 58-32-2
- PubChem CID: 137329
- ChemSpider: 121018
- UNII: R16CO5Y76E; 64ALC7F90C
- KEGG: D11615
- CompTox Dashboard (EPA): DTXSID40236543

The combination drug acetylsalicylic acid/dipyridamole (trade names Aggrenox and others) is a drug combination of:

- Acetylsalicylic acid (Aspirin) - An extremely common NSAID that has anticoagulant effects. There is 25 mg.
- Dipyridamole, a drug that inhibits platelet activation when given chronically and causes vasodilation when given at high doses over short time. There is 200 mg.

The combination acts as an extended release formulation and is primarily used for platelet inhibition in patients suffering, or at risk from, acute coronary events and stroke. Its use has been shown to be better than the use of either dipyridamole or aspirin alone.
