= C19H20N2O3 =

The molecular formula C_{19}H_{20}N_{2}O_{3} (molar mass: 324.37 g/mol, exact mass: 324.1474 u) may refer to:

- Ditazole
- Dolasetron
- Oxyphenbutazone
