= Certoparin sodium =

Pharmaceutical drug

Clinical data
- Trade names: Sandoparin, Embolex
- AHFS/Drugs.com: International Drug Names
- ATC code: none

Identifiers
- CAS Number: 9005-49-6
- DrugBank: DB09261
- ChemSpider: none
- UNII: V72OT3K19I
- CompTox Dashboard (EPA): DTXSID301010914
- ECHA InfoCard: 100.110.590

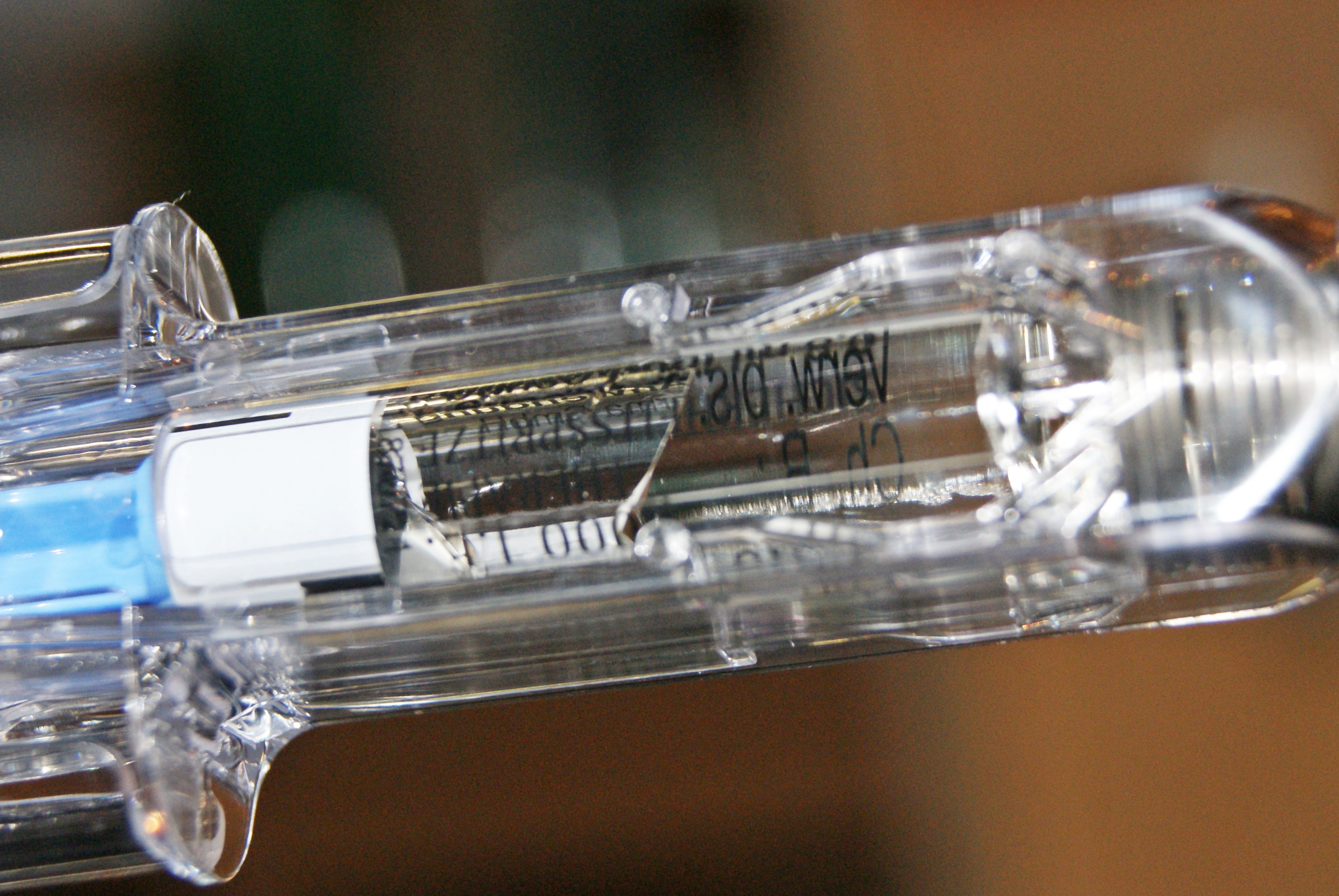
Mono-Embolex®

Certoparin (trade names Sandoparin, Embolex) is an antithrombotic medication. It is a low molecular weight heparin, primarily active against factor Xa. Like other low molecular weight heparins, it is used to prevent deep venous thrombosis.
