= Parnaparin sodium =

Pharmaceutical drug

Clinical data
- AHFS/Drugs.com: International Drug Names
- ATC code: B01AB07 (WHO)

Identifiers
- CAS Number: 9041-08-1
- DrugBank: DB09260
- ChemSpider: none
- UNII: U6K360XMIU
- KEGG: D04977

Parnaparin is an antithrombotic and belongs to the group of low molecular weight heparins. In the prevention and therapy of thromboembolic pathologies, the advent of this class of drugs represented a medical development, since they retain the same effectiveness of unfractionated heparin but with simpler dosing regimens and decreased side effects. In addition to being effective in treating proven deep vein thrombosis and thrombosis-associated phlebopathies, Parnaparin has demonstrated its thromboprophylactic efficacy in both high- and moderate-risk surgical patients.
