= Reviparin sodium =

Pharmaceutical drug

Clinical data
- AHFS/Drugs.com: International Drug Names
- ATC code: B01AB08 (WHO)

Identifiers
- CAS Number: 9005-49-6
- DrugBank: DB09259
- ChemSpider: none
- UNII: 5R0L1D739E
- KEGG: D03337
- CompTox Dashboard (EPA): DTXSID301010914
- ECHA InfoCard: 100.110.590

Reviparin is an antithrombotic and belongs to the group of low molecular weight heparins (LMWH).

== Medical uses ==
- Prevention of blood clots
- Prophylaxis of perioperative thromboembolism
- Treatment of DVT with or without pulmonary embolism (PE)
- Prophylaxis of acute thrombotic events after percutaneous transluminal coronary angioplasty (PTCA)

== Chemistry ==
Reviparin is a low molecular weight heparin obtained by nitrous acid depolymerization of heparin extracted from porcine intestinal mucosa. Its structure is characterized, for the most part, by a group of 2-O-sulfo-α-lidopyranosuronic acid. The average molecular weight is about 3900 daltons.
