= Clorindione =

Chemical compound

Clinical data
- ATC code: B01AA09 (WHO)

Identifiers
- IUPAC name: 2-(4-chlorophenyl)-1H-indene-1,3(2H)-dione
- CAS Number: 1146-99-2
- PubChem CID: 70846
- ChemSpider: 64010
- UNII: 541C7WS64R
- KEGG: D07135
- ChEMBL: ChEMBL278519
- CompTox Dashboard (EPA): DTXSID0046228
- ECHA InfoCard: 100.013.230

Chemical and physical data
- Formula: C_{15}H_{9}ClO_{2}
- Molar mass: 256.69 g·mol^{−1}
- 3D model (JSmol): Interactive image
- SMILES: Clc1ccc(cc1)C3C(=O)c2ccccc2C3=O
- InChI: InChI=1S/C15H9ClO2/c16-10-7-5-9(6-8-10)13-14(17)11-3-1-2-4-12(11)15(13)18/h1-8,13H; Key:NJDUWAXIURWWLN-UHFFFAOYSA-N

Clorindione is a vitamin K antagonist. It is a derivative of phenindione.
