= APSAC =

APSAC may refer to:

- Anistreplase (anisoylated plasminogen streptokinase activator complex)
- Army Public School and College (Pakistan)
