= Cloricromen =

Chemical compound

Clinical data
- ATC code: B01AC02 (WHO)

Identifiers
- IUPAC name: Ethyl 2-(8-chloro-3-(2-(diethylamino)ethyl)-4-methyl-2-oxo-2H-chromen-7-yloxy)acetate
- CAS Number: 68206-94-0
- PubChem CID: 68876
- ChemSpider: 62108
- UNII: B9454PE93C
- KEGG: D07139
- ChEMBL: ChEMBL255066
- CompTox Dashboard (EPA): DTXSID2048373
- ECHA InfoCard: 100.164.003

Chemical and physical data
- Formula: C_{20}H_{26}ClNO_{5}
- Molar mass: 395.88 g·mol^{−1}
- 3D model (JSmol): Interactive image
- SMILES: O=C(OCC)COc2ccc\1c(OC(=O)/C(=C/1C)CCN(CC)CC)c2Cl
- InChI: InChI=1S/C20H26ClNO5/c1-5-22(6-2)11-10-15-13(4)14-8-9-16(26-12-17(23)25-7-3)18(21)19(14)27-20(15)24/h8-9H,5-7,10-12H2,1-4H3; Key:GYNNRVJJLAVVTQ-UHFFFAOYSA-N

Cloricromen is a platelet aggregation inhibitor. Coronary vasodilator.

== Synthesis ==

Base catalyzed alkylation of ethyl acetoacetate (1) with 2-chlorotriethylamine (2) gives compound (3). Separately, disulfonation of resorcinol (4) with 96% sulfuric acid gives the disulfonic acid (5). This is chlorinated with potassium chlorate to give 5-chloro-4,6-dihydroxybenzene-1,3-disulfonic acid (6). Removal of the sulfonate groups in dilute acid then gives 2-chlororesorcinol (7). An acid-catalyzed condensation reaction between (3) and (7) produces the intermediate (8). Ether formation at its phenolic hydroxyl group with ethyl bromoacetate (9) completes the synthesis of cloricromen.

== See also ==
- Carbocromen is the analogue without the chlorine substituent
