= ATC code B01 =

Drug classification – antithrombotic agents

ATC code B01 Antithrombotic agents is a therapeutic subgroup of the Anatomical Therapeutic Chemical Classification System, a system of alphanumeric codes developed by the World Health Organization (WHO) for the classification of drugs and other medical products. Subgroup B01 is part of the anatomical group B Blood and blood forming organs.

Codes for veterinary use (ATCvet codes) can be created by placing the letter Q in front of the human ATC code: for example, QB01.
National versions of the ATC classification may include additional codes not present in this list, which follows the WHO version.

== B01A Antithrombotic agents ==
=== B01AA Vitamin K antagonists ===
B01AA01 Dicoumarol
B01AA02 Phenindione
B01AA03 Warfarin
B01AA04 Phenprocoumon
B01AA07 Acenocoumarol
B01AA08 Ethyl biscoumacetate
B01AA09 Clorindione
B01AA10 Diphenadione
B01AA11 Tioclomarol
B01AA12 Fluindione

=== B01AB Heparin group ===
B01AB01 Heparin
B01AB02 Antithrombin III
B01AB04 Dalteparin
B01AB05 Enoxaparin
B01AB06 Nadroparin
B01AB07 Parnaparin
B01AB08 Reviparin
B01AB09 Danaparoid
B01AB10 Tinzaparin
B01AB11 Sulodexide
B01AB12 Bemiparin
B01AB51 Heparin, combinations

=== B01AC Platelet aggregation inhibitors excluding heparin ===
B01AC01 Ditazole
B01AC02 Cloricromen
B01AC03 Picotamide
B01AC04 Clopidogrel
B01AC05 Ticlopidine
B01AC06 Acetylsalicylic acid
B01AC07 Dipyridamole
B01AC08 Carbasalate calcium
B01AC09 Epoprostenol
B01AC10 Indobufen
B01AC11 Iloprost
B01AC13 Abciximab
B01AC15 Aloxiprin
B01AC16 Eptifibatide
B01AC17 Tirofiban
B01AC18 Triflusal
B01AC19 Beraprost
B01AC21 Treprostinil
B01AC22 Prasugrel
B01AC23 Cilostazol
B01AC24 Ticagrelor
B01AC25 Cangrelor
B01AC26 Vorapaxar
B01AC27 Selexipag
B01AC28 Limaprost
B01AC30 Combinations
B01AC56 Acetylsalicylic acid, combinations with proton pump inhibitors

=== B01AD Enzymes ===
B01AD01 Streptokinase
B01AD02 Alteplase
B01AD03 Anistreplase
B01AD04 Urokinase
B01AD05 Fibrinolysin
B01AD06 Brinase
B01AD07 Reteplase
B01AD08 Saruplase
B01AD09 Ancrod
B01AD10 Drotrecogin alfa (activated)
B01AD11 Tenecteplase
B01AD12 Protein C
B01AD13 Apadamtase alfa and cinaxadamtase alfa

=== B01AE Direct thrombin inhibitors ===
B01AE01 Desirudin
B01AE02 Lepirudin
B01AE03 Argatroban
B01AE04 Melagatran
B01AE05 Ximelagatran
B01AE06 Bivalirudin
B01AE07 Dabigatran etexilate

=== B01AF Direct factor Xa inhibitors ===
B01AF01 Rivaroxaban
B01AF02 Apixaban
B01AF03 Edoxaban
B01AF04 Betrixaban
B01AF51 Rivaroxaban and acetylsalicylic acid

=== B01AX Other antithrombotic agents ===
B01AX01 Defibrotide
B01AX04 Dermatan sulfate
B01AX05 Fondaparinux
B01AX07 Caplacizumab
