= Carbasalate calcium =

Chemical compound

Combination of
- Calcium acetylsalicylate: NSAID, platelet aggregation inhibitor
- Carbamide

Clinical data
- AHFS/Drugs.com: International Drug Names
- Routes of administration: Oral
- ATC code: B01AC08 (WHO) N02BA15 (WHO)

Identifiers
- CAS Number: 5749-67-7
- PubChem CID: 21975
- ChemSpider: 20651
- UNII: N667F17JP1
- CompTox Dashboard (EPA): DTXSID90206099
- ECHA InfoCard: 100.024.794

Carbasalate calcium is an analgesic, antipyretic, and anti-inflammatory drug, as well as a platelet aggregation inhibitor. It is a chelate of calcium acetylsalicylate (the calcium salt of aspirin) and urea.
