= Beraprost =

Chemical compound

Clinical data
- Trade names: Dorner
- AHFS/Drugs.com: International Drug Names
- Routes of administration: Oral
- ATC code: B01AC19 (WHO)

Pharmacokinetic data
- Bioavailability: 50–70%
- Metabolism: Unknown
- Elimination half-life: 35–40 minutes

Identifiers
- IUPAC name: 4-{(1R,2R,3aS,8bS)-2-Hydroxy-1-[(1E,3S)-3-hydroxy-4-methyl-1-octen-6-yn-1-yl]-2,3,3a,8b-tetrahydro-1H-benzo[b]cyclopenta[d]furan-5-yl}butanoic acid
- CAS Number: 88430-50-6 88475-69-8
- PubChem CID: 6917951
- IUPHAR/BPS: 1967
- ChemSpider: 5293169
- UNII: 35E3NJJ4O6
- ChEBI: CHEBI:135633
- ChEMBL: ChEMBL1207745
- CompTox Dashboard (EPA): DTXSID7049136

Chemical and physical data
- Formula: C_{24}H_{30}O_{5}
- Molar mass: 398.499 g·mol^{−1}
- 3D model (JSmol): Interactive image
- SMILES: CC#CCC(C)[C@@H](/C=C/[C@H]1[C@@H](C[C@H]2[C@@H]1C3=CC=CC(=C3O2)CCCC(=O)O)O)O
- InChI: InChI=1S/C24H30O5/c1-3-4-7-15(2)19(25)13-12-17-20(26)14-21-23(17)18-10-5-8-16(24(18)29-21)9-6-11-22(27)28/h5,8,10,12-13,15,17,19-21,23,25-26H,6-7,9,11,14H2,1-2H3,(H,27,28)/b13-12+/t15?,17-,19+,20+,21-,23-/m0/s1; Key:CTPOHARTNNSRSR-APJZLKAGSA-N

Beraprost is a pharmaceutical drug used in several Asian countries, including Japan and South Korea, as a vasodilator and antiplatelet agent. It is classified as a prostacyclin analog.

It has been studied for the treatment of pulmonary hypertension and for use in avoiding reperfusion injury.

== Clinical pharmacology ==
As an analog of prostacyclin PGI_{2}, beraprost affects vasodilation, which in turn lowers blood pressure. Beraprost also inhibits platelet aggregation, though the role this phenomenon may play in relation to pulmonary hypertension has yet to be determined.

== Dosage and administration ==
Beraprost is administered orally as a pill available in strength of 20 mcg. Dose ranges from 60 to 180 mcg in divided doses after meals.
