= Tinzaparin sodium =

Pharmaceutical drug

- n = 1 to 25, R = H or SO_{3}Na, R^{1} = H, SO_{3}Na or COCH_{3}, R^{2} = H and R^{3} = COONa or R^{2} = COONa and R^{3} = H

Clinical data
- Trade names: innohep(R)
- AHFS/Drugs.com: Monograph
- Routes of administration: subcutaneous (once daily)
- ATC code: B01AB10 (WHO)

Pharmacokinetic data
- Bioavailability: 90% for Anti-Xa activity, 67% for Anti-IIa activity)
- Metabolism: minor metabolisation in liver by desulfation and/or depolymerization; excretion via kidneys in almost unchanged form
- Elimination half-life: 200 min. for Anti-Xa activity, 257. min for Anti-IIa activity

Identifiers
- CAS Number: 9041-08-1 (sodium salt)
- ChemSpider: none
- UNII: 3S182ET3UA
- KEGG: D06398
- ChEMBL: ChEMBL1201414
- ECHA InfoCard: 100.110.590

Chemical and physical data
- Molar mass: 6500 g/mol (average)

Tinzaparin is an antithrombotic drug in the heparin group. It is a low molecular weight heparin (LMWH) marketed as Innohep worldwide. It has been approved by the U.S. Food and Drug Administration (FDA) for once daily treatment and prophylaxis of deep vein thrombosis (DVT) and pulmonary embolism (PE).

It can be given subcutaneously by syringe, or intravenously. It was manufactured by Leo pharmaceutical company, who withdrew the product from the US in 2011 due to low sales and a contamination issue.

== Use in elderly ==
In July 2008, the company revised the prescribing information to restrict the use of tinzaparin in patients 90 years of age or older. FDA is concerned that the preliminary data from the IRIS study suggests that the increased risk of mortality is not limited only to patients 90 years of age or older.

According to the study Innohep increases the risk of death for elderly patients (i.e., 70 years of age and older) with chronic kidney disease. Healthcare professionals should consider the use of alternative treatments to Innohep when treating elderly patients over 70 years of age with chronic kidney disease and deep vein thrombosis, pulmonary embolism, or both.

== Use in pregnancy ==
No LMWH, except tinzaparin, is licensed for use in gestational hypercoagulability. Still, tinzaparin is often the LMWH of choice in pregnant women.

== Side effects ==
Bleeding in overdose. There is occasionally bruising at the site of injection.

== Monitoring ==
Tinzaparin does not affect the international normalized ratio (INR), prothrombin time (PT). Anti-factor Xa levels can be measured, and are often used to monitor tinzaparin.

== Reversal agent ==
Protamine sulfate will reverse tinzaparin by 85% per package insert.
