= Saruplase =

Enzyme

Clinical data
- ATC code: B01AD08 (WHO)

Identifiers
- CAS Number: 99149-95-8
- ChemSpider: none
- UNII: U5NH2JV64T

Saruplase is a fibrinolytic enzyme.

It is closely related to urokinase.
