= Brinase =

Enzyme

Clinical data
- ATC code: B01AD06 (WHO)

Identifiers
- CAS Number: 9000-99-1
- DrugBank: DB13199
- ChemSpider: none
- UNII: Z3GVO2327F
- KEGG: D03157

Brinase (or brinolase) is a fibrinolytic enzyme, and a thrombolytic drug.

It is derived from Aspergillus oryzae.

== See also ==
- Aspergillus oryzae
