= Indobufen =

Chemical compound

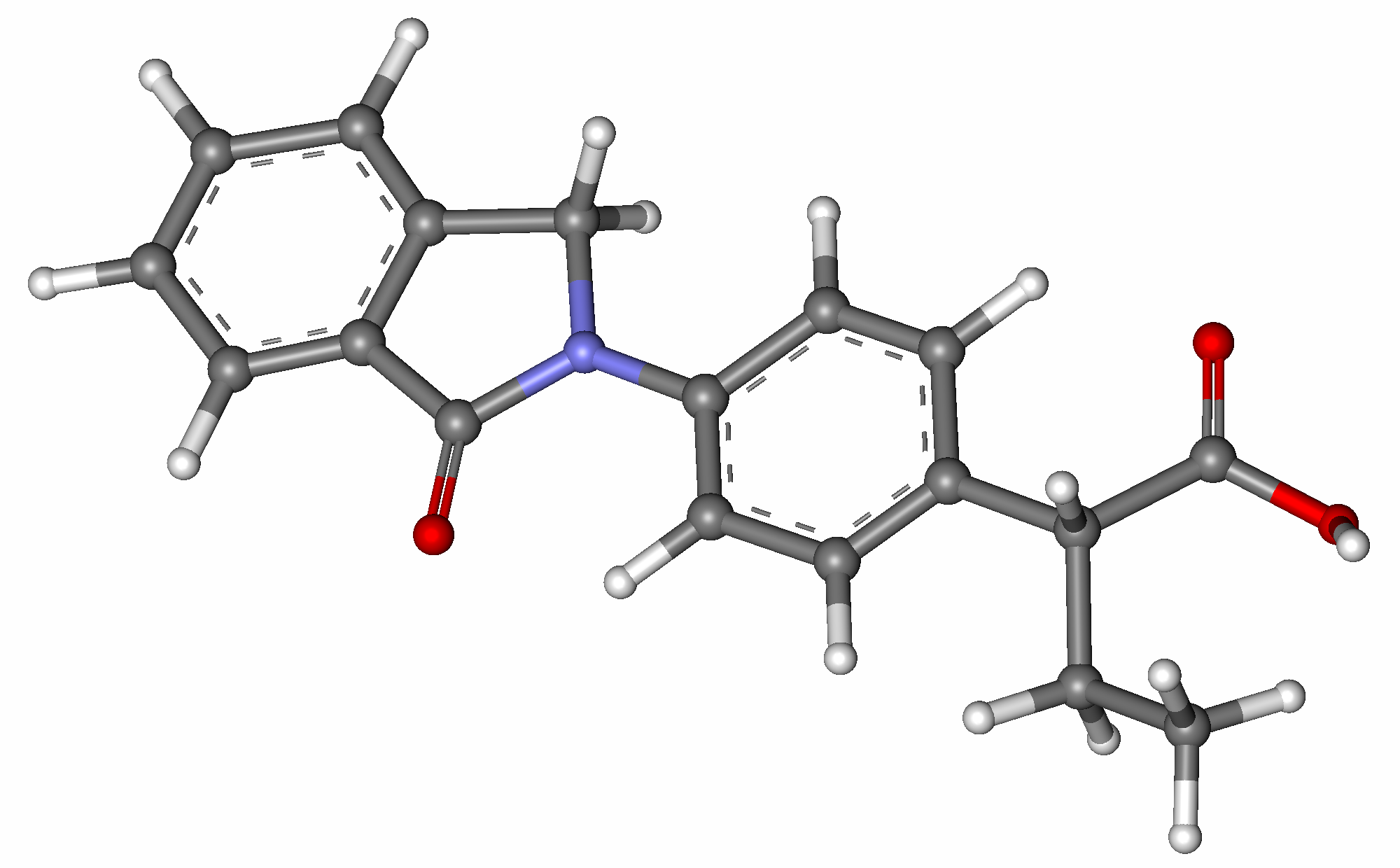

Clinical data
- AHFS/Drugs.com: International Drug Names
- ATC code: B01AC10 (WHO)

Identifiers
- IUPAC name: 2-(4-(1-Oxoisoindolin-2-yl)phenyl)butanoic acid
- CAS Number: 63610-08-2
- PubChem CID: 107641
- ChemSpider: 96823
- UNII: 6T9949G4LZ
- KEGG: D07141
- ChEMBL: ChEMBL1765292
- CompTox Dashboard (EPA): DTXSID7057789
- ECHA InfoCard: 100.058.496

Chemical and physical data
- Formula: C_{18}H_{17}NO_{3}
- Molar mass: 295.338 g·mol^{−1}
- 3D model (JSmol): Interactive image
- SMILES: O=C(O)C(c1ccc(cc1)N3C(=O)c2ccccc2C3)CC
- InChI: InChI=1S/C18H17NO3/c1-2-15(18(21)22)12-7-9-14(10-8-12)19-11-13-5-3-4-6-16(13)17(19)20/h3-10,15H,2,11H2,1H3,(H,21,22); Key:AYDXAULLCROVIT-UHFFFAOYSA-N

Indobufen is a platelet aggregation inhibitor. It acts as a reversible cyclooxygenase inhibitor.
