= Phenindione =

Chemical compound

Clinical data
- AHFS/Drugs.com: International Drug Names
- Pregnancy category: AU: D; Passes into breast milk
- Routes of administration: Oral
- ATC code: B01AA02 (WHO)

Pharmacokinetic data
- Protein binding: 88%
- Elimination half-life: 5 to 10 hours

Identifiers
- IUPAC name: 2-phenyl-1H-indene-1,3(2H)-dione
- CAS Number: 83-12-5
- PubChem CID: 4760
- IUPHAR/BPS: 6838
- DrugBank: DB00498
- ChemSpider: 4596
- UNII: 5M7Y6274ZE
- KEGG: D08354
- ChEBI: CHEBI:8066
- ChEMBL: ChEMBL711
- CompTox Dashboard (EPA): DTXSID5023453
- ECHA InfoCard: 100.001.323

Chemical and physical data
- Formula: C_{15}H_{10}O_{2}
- Molar mass: 222.243 g·mol^{−1}
- 3D model (JSmol): Interactive image
- SMILES: O=C2c1ccccc1C(=O)C2c3ccccc3
- InChI: InChI=1S/C15H10O2/c16-14-11-8-4-5-9-12(11)15(17)13(14)10-6-2-1-3-7-10/h1-9,13H; Key:NFBAXHOPROOJAW-UHFFFAOYSA-N

Phenindione is an anticoagulant which functions as a Vitamin K antagonist.

Phenindione was introduced in the early 1950s. It acts similar to warfarin, but it has been associated with hypersensitivity reactions, so it is rarely used and warfarin is preferred.
