= Ditazole =

Chemical compound

Clinical data
- AHFS/Drugs.com: International Drug Names
- ATC code: B01AC01 (WHO)

Identifiers
- IUPAC name: 2,2'-(4,5-Diphenyloxazol-2-ylazanediyl)diethanol
- CAS Number: 18471-20-0
- PubChem CID: 29088
- DrugBank: DB08994
- ChemSpider: 27061
- UNII: H2BQI5Z8FT
- KEGG: D07138
- CompTox Dashboard (EPA): DTXSID3022954
- ECHA InfoCard: 100.038.488

Chemical and physical data
- Formula: C_{19}H_{20}N_{2}O_{3}
- Molar mass: 324.380 g·mol^{−1}
- 3D model (JSmol): Interactive image
- SMILES: C1=CC=C(C=C1)C2=C(OC(=N2)N(CCO)CCO)C3=CC=CC=C3
- InChI: InChI=1S/C19H20N2O3/c22-13-11-21(12-14-23)19-20-17(15-7-3-1-4-8-15)18(24-19)16-9-5-2-6-10-16/h1-10,22-23H,11-14H2; Key:UUCMDZWCRNZCOY-UHFFFAOYSA-N

Ditazole is a non-steroidal anti-inflammatory agent with analgesic and antipyretic activity similar to phenylbutazone. It is also a platelet aggregation inhibitor which is marketed in Spain and Portugal under the trade name Ageroplas.
