= Heparin-sulfate lyase =

Catalytic chemical

heparin-sulfate lyase

Identifiers
- EC no.: 4.2.2.8
- CAS no.: 37290-86-1

Databases
- IntEnz: IntEnz view
- BRENDA: BRENDA entry
- ExPASy: NiceZyme view
- KEGG: KEGG entry
- MetaCyc: metabolic pathway
- PRIAM: profile
- PDB structures: RCSB PDB PDBe PDBsum
- Gene Ontology: AmiGO / QuickGO
Search
- PMC: articles
- PubMed: articles
- NCBI: proteins

The enzyme heparin-sulfate lyase (EC 4.2.2.8) catalyzes the chemical reaction

Elimination of sulfate; appears to act on linkages between N-acetyl-D-lucosamine and uronate. Product is an unsaturated sugar.

This enzyme belongs to the family of lyases, specifically those carbon-oxygen lyases acting on polysaccharides. The systematic name of this enzyme class is heparin-sulfate lyase. Other names in common use include heparin-sulfate eliminase, heparitin-sulfate lyase, heparitinase I, and heparitinase II.
