= Dipyridamole =

Anticoagulant drug

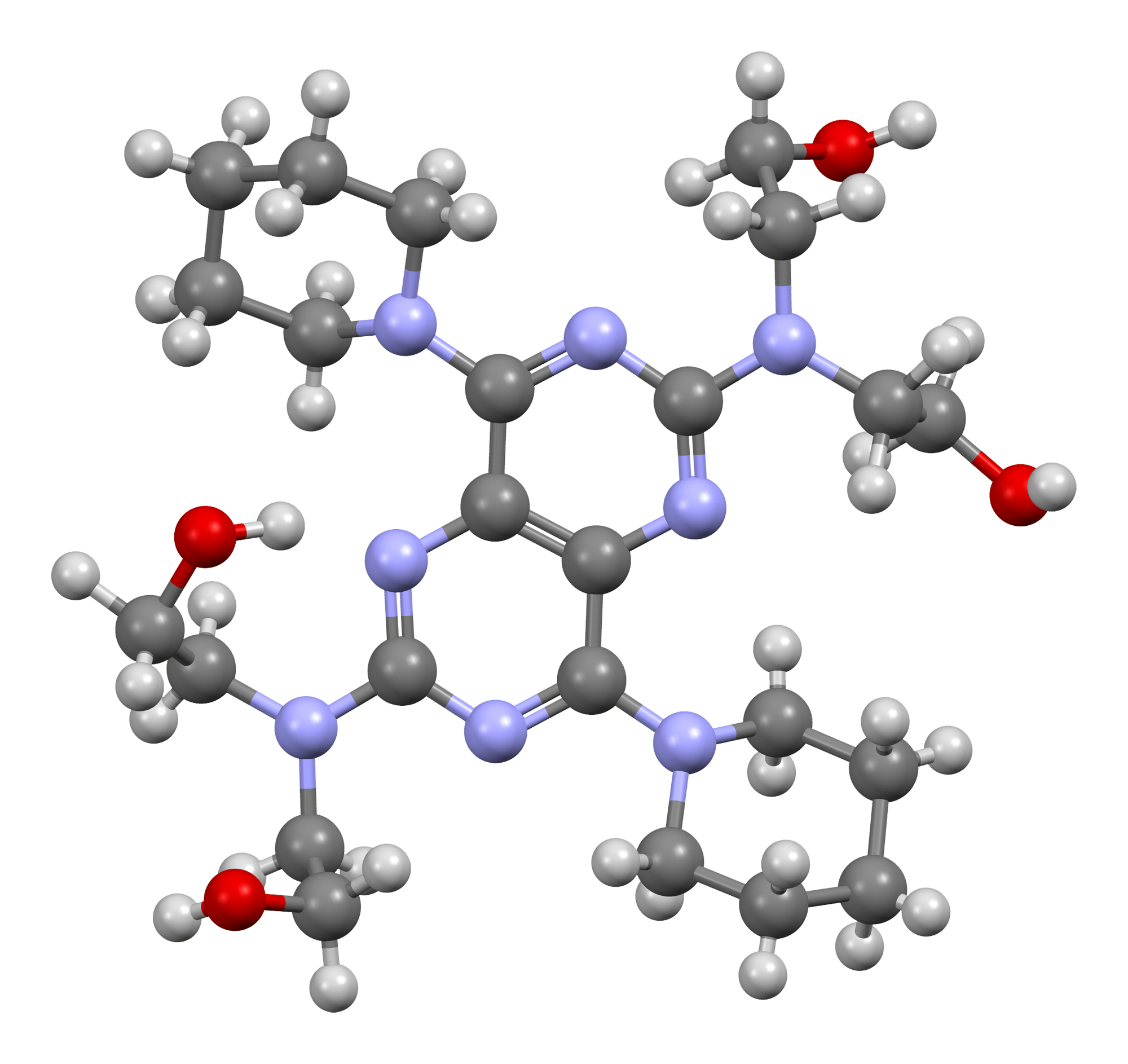

Clinical data
- Trade names: Persantine, others
- AHFS/Drugs.com: Monograph
- MedlinePlus: a682830
- Routes of administration: By mouth, intravenous
- ATC code: B01AC07 (WHO)

Legal status
- Legal status: UK: POM (Prescription only); US: ℞-only

Pharmacokinetic data
- Bioavailability: 37–66%
- Protein binding: ~99%
- Metabolism: Liver (glucuronidation)
- Elimination half-life: α phase: 40 min, β phase: 10 hours
- Excretion: Biliary (95%), urine (negligible)

Identifiers
- IUPAC name: 2,2',2'',2'''-(4,8-di(piperidin-1-yl)pyrimido[5,4-d]pyrimidine-2,6-diyl)bis(azanetriyl)tetraethanol
- CAS Number: 58-32-2
- PubChem CID: 3108
- IUPHAR/BPS: 4807
- DrugBank: DB00975
- ChemSpider: 2997
- UNII: 64ALC7F90C
- KEGG: D00302
- ChEBI: CHEBI:4653
- ChEMBL: ChEMBL932
- CompTox Dashboard (EPA): DTXSID6040668
- ECHA InfoCard: 100.000.340

Chemical and physical data
- Formula: C_{24}H_{40}N_{8}O_{4}
- Molar mass: 504.636 g·mol^{−1}
- 3D model (JSmol): Interactive image
- SMILES: C1CCN(CC1)C2=NC(=NC3=C2N=C(N=C3N4CCCCC4)N(CCO)CCO)N(CCO)CCO
- InChI: InChI=1S/C24H40N8O4/c33-15-11-31(12-16-34)23-26-20-19(21(27-23)29-7-3-1-4-8-29)25-24(32(13-17-35)14-18-36)28-22(20)30-9-5-2-6-10-30/h33-36H,1-18H2; Key:IZEKFCXSFNUWAM-UHFFFAOYSA-N

Dipyridamole, sold under the brand name Persantine among others, is an antiplatelet drug of the nucleoside transport inhibitor and PDE3 inhibitor class that inhibits blood clot formation when given chronically and causes blood vessel dilation when given at high doses over a short time.

== Medical uses ==
- Dipyridamole is used to dilate blood vessels in people with peripheral arterial disease and coronary artery disease.
- Dipyridamole has been shown to lower pulmonary hypertension without significant drop of systemic blood pressure.
- It inhibits proliferation of smooth muscle cells in vivo and modestly increases unassisted patency of synthetic arteriovenous hemodialysis grafts.
- Cyclic adenosine monophosphate impairs platelet aggregation and also causes arteriolar smooth muscle relaxation. Chronic therapy did not show significant drop of systemic blood pressure.
- It inhibits the replication of mengovirus RNA.
- It can be used for myocardial stress testing as an alternative to exercise-induced stress methods such as treadmills.
- It is an experimental agent used for the treatment of restless leg syndrome, conditionally recommended by the American Academy of Sleep Medicine as a second-line treatment (conditional recommendation, low certainty of evidence).

=== Stroke ===
A combination of dipyridamole and aspirin (acetylsalicylic acid/dipyridamole) is FDA-approved for the secondary prevention of stroke and has a bleeding risk equal to that of aspirin use alone. Dipyridamole absorption is pH-dependent and concomitant treatment with gastric acid suppressors (such as a proton pump inhibitor) will inhibit the absorption of liquid and plain tablets.

However, it is not licensed as monotherapy for stroke prophylaxis, although a Cochrane review suggested that dipyridamole may reduce the risk of further vascular events in patients presenting after cerebral ischemia.

A triple therapy of aspirin, clopidogrel, and dipyridamole has been investigated, but this combination led to an increase in adverse bleeding events.

== Interactions ==
Due to its action as a phosphodiesterase inhibitor, dipyridamole is likely to potentiate the effects of adenosine. This occurs by blocking the nucleoside transporter (ENT1) through which adenosine enters erythrocyte and endothelial cells.

According to Association of Anaesthetists of Great Britain and Ireland 2016 guidelines, dipyridamole is considered to not cause risk of bleeding when receiving neuroaxial anaesthesia and deep nerve blocks. It does not therefore require cessation prior to anaesthesia with these techniques, and can continue to be taken with nerve block catheters in place.

== Overdose ==
Dipyridamole overdose can be treated with aminophylline or caffeine which reverses its dilating effect on the blood vessels. Symptomatic treatment is recommended, possibly including a vasopressor drug. Gastric lavage should be considered. Since dipyridamole is highly protein bound, dialysis is not likely to be of benefit.

== Mechanisms of action ==
Dipyridamole has two known effects, acting via different mechanisms of action:

- Dipyridamole inhibits the phosphodiesterase enzymes that normally break down cAMP (increasing cellular cAMP levels and blocking the platelet aggregation, response to ADP) and/or cGMP.
- Dipyridamole inhibits the cellular reuptake of adenosine into platelets, red blood cells, and endothelial cells, leading to increased extracellular concentrations of adenosine.
