= Intravascular immunity =

Intravascular immunity describes the immune response in the bloodstream, and its role is to fight and prevent the spread of pathogens. Components of intravascular immunity include the cellular immune response and the macromolecules secreted by these cells. It can result in responses such as inflammation and immunothrombosis. Dysregulated intravascular immune response or pathogen evasion can create conditions like thrombosis, sepsis, or disseminated intravascular coagulation.

== Cellular Defenses ==
In a healthy individual, immune cells patrol blood vessels to detect and respond to danger through molecules frequently found on pathogens called PAMPs, and molecules that are released by damaged cells, DAMPs. Immune cells involved in intravascular surveillance are neutrophils, monocytes, invariant natural killer T cells, kupffer cells, platelets, and mast cells. These cells express particular receptors such as toll-like receptors and proteins like CD36 that allow them to recognize and respond to danger signals. Endothelial cells lining the vasculature are also a part of the intravasculature's cellular defense system. They express molecules such as, CD14, TLR2, TLR4, TLR9, MD2, and MyD88, to detect bacteria in the blood.

Leukocytes move through blood vessels using protein-protein interactions between cells and are also assisted by blood flow. Circulating immune cells behave differently in the presence and absence of an infection. For example, in the absence of an invader, monocytes migrate randomly throughout the microvasculature, cerebral vessels, and mesentery vessels. However, in the presence of an invader, monocytes emigrate to the infected area. Similarly, neutrophils use a rolling mechanism to counteract the blood flow and localize to the infected area. In a healthy state, neutrophils have been observed to exhibit a similar but brief crawling mechanism. The function and precise mechanism is not yet known.

== Immune Responses ==
=== Inflammation ===
For more details on this topic, see Inflammation.

Inflammation is an immune response in the body tissue due to stimulation of immune cells by pathogens, DAMPs, or stress. The vasculature provides a means of transportation for alerting and recruiting immune cells.

=== Immunothrombosis ===
Thrombosis is the formation of blood coagulation and platelet aggregation and may result in lack of blood flow through the circulatory system. The depletion of oxygen may cause irreversible damage to organs. However, in other circumstances, the physiological process can be beneficial for the body. This process is known as immunothrombosis. The process isolates infections using blood clots formed by activated platelets, leukocytes, and coagulation factors assist leukocytes in adhering and migrating to infected areas. Activated platelets produce fibrin in the blood vessel which seal leaky vessels and are important in blood coagulation. Fibrin provides a matrix to trap pathogens and recruit immune cells. Characteristics such as elongation and thickness of fibrin and protofibril, the precursor of fibrin, are determined by many factors including environmental conditions, physiological conditions, and branching of the fibrin fibers. This in turn influences the clot structure such as permeability, stiffness, and how easily the clot can be retracted. The shift from immunothrombosis to a more pathogenic thrombosis is due to dysregulated immunothrombosis.
