= Heparin lyase =

Enzyme

heparin lyase

Identifiers
- EC no.: 4.2.2.7
- CAS no.: 9025-39-2

Databases
- IntEnz: IntEnz view
- BRENDA: BRENDA entry
- ExPASy: NiceZyme view
- KEGG: KEGG entry
- MetaCyc: metabolic pathway
- PRIAM: profile
- PDB structures: RCSB PDB PDBe PDBsum
- Gene Ontology: AmiGO / QuickGO
Search
- PMC: articles
- PubMed: articles
- NCBI: proteins

The enzyme heparin lyase (EC 4.2.2.7) catalyzes the following process:

Eliminative cleavage of polysaccharides containing (1→4)-linked D-glucuronate or L-iduronate residues and (1→4)-α-linked 2-sulfoamino-2-deoxy-6-sulfo-D-glucose residues to give oligosaccharides with terminal 4-deoxy-α-D-gluc-4-enuronosyl groups at their non-reducing ends

This enzyme belongs to the family of lyases, specifically those carbon-oxygen lyases acting on polysaccharides. The systematic name of this enzyme class is heparin lyase. Other names in common use include heparin eliminase, and heparinase.
