= Anistreplase =

Pharmaceutical drug used to treat blood clots

Clinical data
- Trade names: Eminase
- AHFS/Drugs.com: Micromedex Detailed Consumer Information
- ATC code: B01AD03 (WHO)

Pharmacokinetic data
- Elimination half-life: 90 minutes

Identifiers
- CAS Number: 81669-57-0
- DrugBank: DB00029
- ChemSpider: none
- UNII: 5O8V541HJ6
- KEGG: D02947

Chemical and physical data
- Molar mass: approx. 131 kg/mol

Anistreplase is a thrombolytic drug. It is also known as anisoylated plasminogen streptokinase activator complex (APSAC). As a thrombolytic drug, it is used to treat blood clots in emergency situations.

== Uses ==
Anistreplase is used to treat blood clots in emergency situations such as myocardial infarction. Early treatment gives better outcomes.

== History ==
Anistreplase has been developed by Beecham under the brand name Eminase. It is also known as anisoylated plasminogen streptokinase activator complex (APSAC) after its components.
