= Dalteparin sodium =

Pharmaceutical drug

Clinical data
- Trade names: Fragmin
- AHFS/Drugs.com: Monograph
- Pregnancy category: AU: C
- Routes of administration: Subcutaneous
- ATC code: B01AB04 (WHO)

Legal status
- Legal status: AU: S4 (Prescription only); US: ℞-only

Pharmacokinetic data
- Bioavailability: 81-93%
- Elimination half-life: 3-5 hours subcutaneous; 2.1-2.3 hours IV
- Excretion: Kidney

Identifiers
- CAS Number: 9041-08-1
- DrugBank: DB06779
- ChemSpider: none
- UNII: 12M44VTJ7B
- KEGG: D03353
- ECHA InfoCard: 100.110.590

Dalteparin is a low molecular weight heparin. It is marketed as Fragmin. Like other low molecular weight heparins, dalteparin is used for prophylaxis or treatment of deep vein thrombosis and pulmonary embolism and to reduce the risk of a stroke or heart attack. Dalteparin acts by potentiating the activity of antithrombin III, inhibiting formation of both Factor Xa and thrombin. It is normally administered by self-injection.

The CLOT study, published in 2003, showed that in patients with malignancy and acute venous thromboembolism (VTE), dalteparin was more effective than warfarin in reducing the risk of recurrent embolic events. Dalteparin is not superior to unfractionated heparin in preventing blood clots.

Heparins are cleared by the kidneys, but studies have shown that dalteparin does not accumulate even if kidney function is reduced. Approximately 70% of dalteparin is excreted through kidneys based on animal studies.

In May 2019, the U.S. Food and Drug Administration (FDA) approved Fragmin injection to reduce the recurrence of symptomatic VTE in pediatric patients one month of age and older. It is on the World Health Organization's List of Essential Medicines.
