= Low-molecular-weight heparin =

Anticoagulant medication

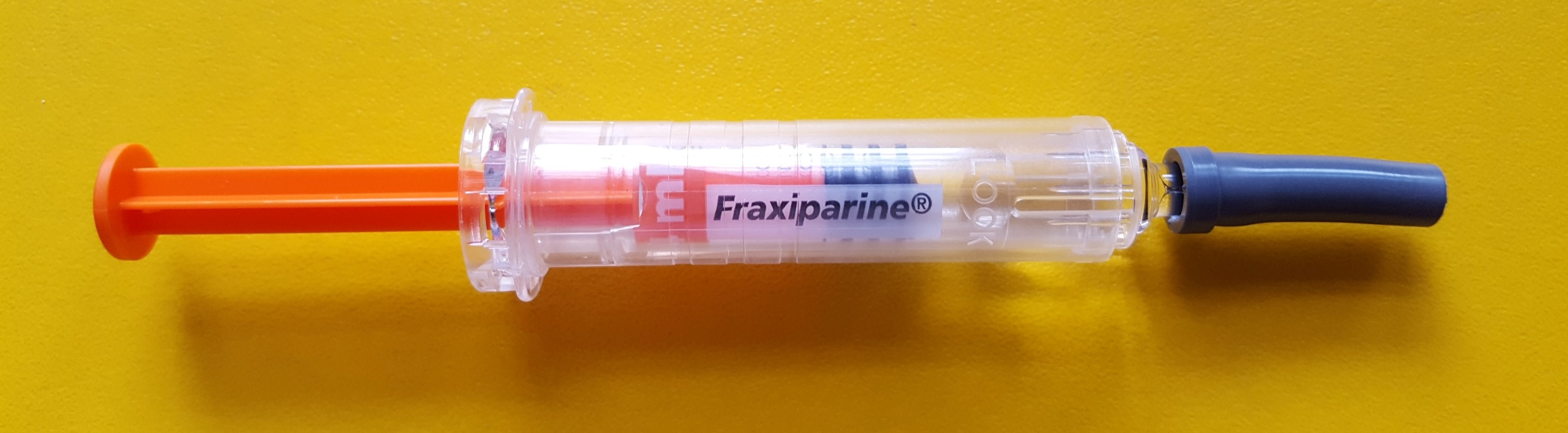
- Nadroparin in prefilled syringe

Pharmacokinetic data
- Bioavailability: 100%

Chemical and physical data
- Molar mass: 4-6 kDa

Low-molecular-weight heparin (LMWH) is a class of anticoagulant medications. They are used in the prevention of blood clots and, in the treatment of venous thromboembolism (deep vein thrombosis and pulmonary embolism), and the treatment of myocardial infarction.

Heparin is a naturally occurring polysaccharide that inhibits coagulation, preventing thrombosis. Natural heparin consists of molecular chains of varying lengths or molecular weights. Chains of varying molecular weights, from 5000 to over 40,000 daltons (Da), make up polydisperse pharmaceutical-grade heparin. LMWHs, in contrast, consist of only short chains of polysaccharides. LMWHs are defined as heparin salts having an average molecular weight of less than 8000 Da and for which at least 60% of all chains have a molecular weight less than 8000 Da. Various methods of fractionation or depolymerization of polymeric heparin obtain these.

Heparin derived from natural sources, mainly porcine intestine or bovine lung, can be administered therapeutically to prevent thrombosis. However, the effects of natural or unfractionated heparin are more unpredictable than LMWH.

== Medical uses ==
Because it can be given subcutaneously and does not require APTT monitoring, LMWH permits outpatient treatment of conditions such as deep vein thrombosis or pulmonary embolism that previously mandated inpatient hospitalization for unfractionated heparin administration.

Because LMWH has more predictable pharmacokinetics and anticoagulant effects, LMWH is recommended over unfractionated heparin for patients with massive pulmonary embolism and for initial treatment of deep vein thrombosis. As compared to placebo or no intervention, prophylactic treatment of hospitalized medical patients using LMWH and similar anticoagulants reduces the risk of venous thromboembolism, notably pulmonary embolism.

More recently, these agents have been evaluated as anticoagulants in acute coronary syndrome (ACS) and managed by percutaneous intervention (PCI).

The use of LMWH needs to be monitored closely in patients at extremes of weight or in patients with renal dysfunction. An anti-factor Xa activity may be useful for monitoring anticoagulation. Given its renal clearance, LMWH may not be feasible in patients with end-stage renal disease. LMWH can also be used to maintain the patency of cannulae and shunts in dialysis patients.

Patients with cancer are at higher risk of venous thromboembolism, and LMWHs are used to reduce this risk. The CLOT study, published in 2003, showed that dalteparin was more effective in patients with malignancy and acute venous thromboembolism than warfarin in reducing the risk of recurrent embolic events. The use of LMWH in cancer patients for at least the first 3 to 6 months of long-term treatment is recommended in numerous guidelines and is now regarded as a standard of care.

== Contraindications ==
The use of LMWHs should be avoided in patients with known allergies to LMWHs, heparin, sulfites or benzyl alcohol, in patients with active major bleeding, or in patients with a history of heparin-induced low blood platelet count (also known as heparin-induced thrombocytopenia or HIT). High treatment doses are contraindicated in acute bleeding such as cerebral or gastrointestinal hemorrhage. LMWHs depend more on renal function for their excretion than unfractionated heparin, so their biological half-life may be prolonged in patients with kidney failure. Therefore, their use in patients with creatinine clearance rate (CrCl) <30 mL/min may need to be avoided. Apart from using unfractionated heparin instead, it may be possible to reduce the dose and/or monitor the anti-Xa activity to guide treatment.

The most common side effects include bleeding, which could be severe or even fatal, allergic reactions, injection site reactions, and increases in liver enzyme tests, usually without symptoms. Heparin and LMWHs can sometimes be complicated by a decrease in platelet count, a complication known as Heparin-induced thrombocytopenia.13 Two forms have been described: a clinically benign, non-immune and reversible form (Type I) and a rare, more serious immune-mediated form or Type II. HIT Type II is caused by the formation of autoantibodies that recognize complexes between heparin and platelet factor 4 (PF4) and is, therefore, associated with a substantial risk of thrombotic complications. The incidence is difficult to estimate but may reach up to 5% of patients treated with UFH or about 1% with LMWH.

=== Antidote ===
In clinical situations where the antithrombotic effect of LMWHs needs to be neutralized, protamine is used to neutralize heparin by binding to it. Animal and in vitro studies have demonstrated that protamine neutralizes the antithrombin activity of LMWHs, normalizing the aPTT and thrombin time. However, protamine appears only partially to neutralize the anti-factor Xa activity of LMWH. Because the molecular weight of heparin impacts its interaction with protamine, the lack of complete neutralization of anti-factor Xa is likely due to reduced protamine binding to the LMWH moieties in the preparation. Protamine is a medicine that requires a high level of caution when used.

=== Precautions ===
LMWH trials usually excluded individuals with unpredictable pharmacokinetics. As a result, patients with risks, such as the severely obese or in advanced stages of kidney failure, show decreased benefits due to fractionated heparin's increased half-life. LMWHs should be used with extreme caution in patients undergoing any procedure involving spinal anesthesia/puncture, in conditions with increased risk of bleeding or in patients with a history of heparin-induced thrombocytopenia.

== Pharmacology ==
=== Mechanism of action ===
The coagulation cascade is a normal physiological process to prevent significant blood loss or hemorrhage following vascular injury. Unfortunately, there are times when a blood clot (thrombus) forms when it is not needed. For instance, some high-risk conditions, such as prolonged immobilization, surgery, or cancer, can increase the risk of developing a blood clot, which can potentially lead to significant consequences.

The coagulation cascade consists of a series of steps in which a protease cleaves and subsequently activates the next protease in the sequence. Since each protease can activate several molecules of the next protease in the series, this biological cascade is amplified. The result of these reactions is to convert fibrinogen, a soluble protein, to insoluble threads of fibrin. Together with platelets, the fibrin threads form a stable blood clot.

Antithrombin (AT), a serine protease inhibitor, is the major plasma inhibitor of coagulation proteases. LMWHs inhibit the coagulation process by binding to AT via a pentasaccharide sequence. This binding leads to a conformational change of AT, increasing the rate at which it inhibits activated factor X (factor Xa). Once dissociated, the LMWH is free to bind to another antithrombin molecule and subsequently inhibit more activated factor X. Unlike AT activated by heparin, AT activated by LMWH cannot inhibit thrombin (factor IIa) but can only inhibit clotting factor Xa.

The effects of LMWHs cannot be acceptably measured using the partial thromboplastin time (PTT) or activated clotting time (ACT) tests. Instead, LMWH therapy is monitored by the anti-factor Xa assay, measuring anti-factor Xa activity rather than a clotting time. The methodology of an anti-factor Xa assay is that patient plasma is added to a known amount of excess recombinant factor X and excess antithrombin. If heparin or LMWH is present in the patient's plasma, it will bind to antithrombin and form a complex with factor X, inhibiting it from becoming factor Xa. The amount of residual factor Xa is inversely proportional to the amount of heparin/LMWH in the plasma. The amount of residual factor Xa is detected by adding a chromogenic substrate that mimics the natural substrate of factor Xa, making residual factor Xa cleave it, releasing a colored compound that a spectrophotometer can detect. Antithrombin deficiencies in the patient do not affect the assay because excess amounts of antithrombin is provided in the reaction. Results are given in units/mL of anti-factor Xa, such that high values indicate high levels of anticoagulation and low values indicate low levels of anticoagulation in the plasma sample.

LMWHs have a targeted therapeutic window of approximately 0.6–1.2 IU/ml. LMWH has a potency of 70 units/mg of anti-factor Xa activity and a ratio of anti-factor Xa activity to anti-thrombin activity of >1.5. (see Table 1)

LMWH	Average molecular weight	Ratio anti-Xa/anti-IIa activity
Bemiparin	3600	9.7
Nadroparin	4300	3.3
Reviparin	4400	4.2
Enoxaparin	4500	3.9
Parnaparin	5000	2.3
Certoparin	5400	2.4
Dalteparin	6000	2.5
Tinzaparin	6500	1.6

Table 1 Molecular weight (MW) data and anticoagulant activities of currently available LMWH products. Adapted from Gray E et al. 2008.

== Manufacturing process ==
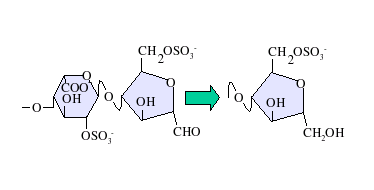
Figure 1: The anhydromannose in IdoA(2S)-anhydromannose can be reduced to an anhydromannitol.

Various methods of heparin depolymerization are used in the manufacture of low-molecular-weight heparin. These are listed below:

- Oxidative depolymerization with hydrogen peroxide. Used in the manufacture of ardeparin (Normiflo)
- Deaminative cleavage with isoamyl nitrite. Used in the manufacture of certoparin (Sandoparin)
- Alkaline beta-eliminative cleavage of the benzyl ester of heparin. Used in the manufacture of enoxaparin (Lovenox and Clexane)
- Oxidative depolymerization with Cu^{2+} and hydrogen peroxide. Used in the manufacture of parnaparin (Fluxum)
- Beta-eliminative cleavage by the heparinase enzyme. Used in the manufacture of tinzaparin (Innohep and Logiparin)
- Deaminative cleavage with nitrous acid. Used in the manufacture of dalteparin (Fragmin), reviparin (Clivarin), and nadroparin (Fraxiparin)

Deaminative cleavage with nitrous acid forms an unnatural anhydromannose residue at the reducing terminal of the oligosaccharides produced. This can subsequently be converted to anhydromannitol using a suitable reducing agent, as shown in figure 1.

Figure 2: UA(2S)-GlcNS(6S)

Likewise, chemical and enzymatic beta-elimination results in an unnatural unsaturated uronate residue (UA) at the non-reducing terminal, as shown in figure 2.

In addition, low molecular weight heparins can also be chemoenzymatically synthesized from simple disaccharides.

=== Differences between LMWHs ===
Comparisons between LMWHs prepared by similar processes vary. For example, a comparison of dalteparin and nadroparin suggests they are more similar than products produced by different processes. However, a comparison of enoxaparin and tinzaparin shows they are very different from each other with respect to chemical, physical, and biological properties.

As might be expected, products prepared by distinctly different processes are dissimilar in physical, chemical, and biological properties. Hence, a slight change in the depolymerization process could result in substantial variation in the structure or composition of a given LMWH.

Therefore, for every LMWH, a strictly defined depolymerization procedure is needed to guarantee the sameness of the final LMWH product and the predictability of clinical outcomes. LMWHs, as biological origin products, rely on stringent manufacturing procedures to guarantee the absence of biological or chemical contamination. It is, therefore, critical to adopt stringent manufacturing practices through rigorous quality assurance steps to ensure the highest quality of the produced LMWHs and to guarantee patient safety. These quality assurance steps, to be effective, need to be implemented from the raw material (crude heparin) collection to the final LMWH product.

Due to these identified and potential differences, several organizations, including the United States Food and Drug Administration, the European Medicines Agency, and the World Health Organization, regard LMWHs as individual products that should not be considered clinically equivalent, as they differ in many crucial aspects such as molecular, structural, physiochemical, and biological properties. According to international guidelines, the choice of an individual LMWH should be based on its proven clinical safety and efficacy for each indication. Therefore, switching from LMWH to another LMWH during treatment is not recommended during clinical practice.

=== Differences from unfractionated heparin ===
Differences from heparin (i.e. "unfractionated heparin") include:

- Average molecular weight: heparin is about 15 kDa, and LMWH is about 4.5 kDa.
- Less frequent subcutaneous dosing than for heparin for postoperative prophylaxis of venous thromboembolism.
- Once or twice daily subcutaneous injection for treatment of venous thromboembolism and in unstable angina instead of intravenous infusion of high-dose heparin.
- There is no need to monitor the APTT coagulation parameter as required for high-dose heparin.
- Possibly a smaller risk of bleeding.
- Smaller risk of osteoporosis in long-term use.
- Smaller risk of heparin-induced thrombocytopenia, a potential side effect of heparin.
- Heparin anticoagulant effects are typically reversible with protamine sulfate, while protamine's effect on LMWH is limited.
- LMWH has less of an effect on thrombin than heparin, but about the same effect on Factor Xa.
- Due to its renal clearance, LMWH is contraindicated in patients with kidney disease who can safely use unfractionated heparin.

=== Generics and biosimilars ===
When the commercial patent of LMWH expires, a generic or biosimilar LMWH can be marketed. The Food and Drug Administration approved the first "generic" LMWH in July 2010. The FDA has used five analytical and pharmacological criteria to establish the authenticity of a generic LMWH without requiring clinical studies in patients.

From a regulatory viewpoint, the FDA considers LMWHs (as well as insulin, glucagon and somatropin) as "generic" drugs, even though they may be sourced from biological material. The European Medicines Agency considers LMWH biologicals, so their regulatory approval – as biosimilars – is approached differently than the FDA's.
