= Antithrombotic =

Drug that reduces the formation of blood clots

An antithrombotic agent is a drug that reduces the formation of blood clots (thrombi). Antithrombotics can be used therapeutically for prevention (primary prevention, secondary prevention) or treatment of a dangerous blood clot (acute thrombus). In the U.S., the American College of Chest Physicians publishes clinical guidelines for clinicians for the use of these drugs to treat and prevent a variety of diseases.

== Processes ==
Different antithrombotics affect different blood clotting processes:

- Antiplatelet drugs limit the migration or aggregation of platelets.
- Anticoagulants limit the ability of the blood to clot.
- Thrombolytic drugs act to dissolve clots after they have formed.

== See also ==
- Direct Xa inhibitor
- Warfarin
