= Ciraparantag =

Chemical compound

Clinical data
- Other names: PER977; N^{1},N^{1′}-[Piperazine-1,4-diylbis(propane-1,3-diyl)]bis-L-argininamide
- Routes of administration: Intravenous
- ATC code: None

Legal status
- Legal status: Investigational

Pharmacokinetic data
- Onset of action: 10 min
- Duration of action: 24 hours

Identifiers
- IUPAC name: (2S)-2-Amino-N-[3-[4-[3-[[(2S)-2-amino-5-(diaminomethylideneamino)pentanoyl]amino]propyl]piperazin-1-yl]propyl]-5-(diaminomethylideneamino)pentanamide
- CAS Number: 1438492-26-2
- PubChem CID: 71576543
- ChemSpider: 33427375
- UNII: U2R67KV65Q
- KEGG: D10868
- CompTox Dashboard (EPA): DTXSID701045783

Chemical and physical data
- Formula: C_{22}H_{48}N_{12}O_{2}
- Molar mass: 512.708 g·mol^{−1}
- 3D model (JSmol): Interactive image
- SMILES: C1CN(CCN1CCCNC(=O)[C@H](CCCNC(=N)N)N)CCCNC(=O)[C@H](CCCNC(=N)N)N
- InChI: InChI=1S/C22H48N12O2/c23-17(5-1-7-31-21(25)26)19(35)29-9-3-11-33-13-15-34(16-14-33)12-4-10-30-20(36)18(24)6-2-8-32-22(27)28/h17-18H,1-16,23-24H2,(H,29,35)(H,30,36)(H4,25,26,31)(H4,27,28,32)/t17-,18-/m0/s1; Key:HRDUUSCYRPOMSO-ROUUACIJSA-N

Ciraparantag (aripazine) is a drug under investigation as an antidote for a number of anticoagulant (anti-blood clotting) drugs, including factor Xa inhibitors (rivaroxaban, apixaban and edoxaban), dabigatran, and heparins (including fondaparinux, low molecular weight heparins (LMWH), and unfractionated heparin).

== Medical uses ==
Ciraparantag significantly reverses anticoagulation induced by a therapeutic dose of edoxaban within 10 minutes following injection. This return to normal haemostasis persists over 24 hours following a single intravenous dose of the drug. In addition to edoxaban, it also reverses the actions of LMWH and dabigatran.

== Pharmacology ==
=== Mechanism of action ===
According to in vitro studies, the substance binds directly to anticoagulants via hydrogen bonds and charge-charge interactions from or to various parts of the molecule:

Hydrogen bonds	Rivaroxaban	Apixaban	Edoxaban	Dabigatran	Heparins
Guanidine part	check		check	check	check
α-Amino group	check	check		check	check
Amide nitrogen	check			check	check
Amide oxygen		check	check		

== Chemistry ==
Ciraparantag consists of two L-arginine units connected with a piperazine containing linker chain.

== See also ==
- Andexanet alfa
- Idarucizumab
- Prothrombin complex concentrate
- Vitamin K
