= Betrixaban =

Chemical compound

Clinical data
- Trade names: Bevyxxa
- Other names: PRT054021, PRT064445
- AHFS/Drugs.com: bevyxxa
- Routes of administration: By mouth
- ATC code: B01AF04 (WHO)

Legal status
- Legal status: US: ℞-only

Pharmacokinetic data
- Protein binding: 60%
- Elimination half-life: 19–27 hrs
- Duration of action: ≥72 hrs
- Excretion: 85% feces, 11% urine

Identifiers
- IUPAC name: N-(5-Chloropyridin-2-yl)-2-([4-(N,N-dimethylcarbamimidoyl)benzoyl]amino)-5-methoxybenzamide
- CAS Number: 330942-05-7
- PubChem CID: 10275777
- DrugBank: DB12364
- ChemSpider: 18981107
- UNII: 74RWP7W0J9
- KEGG: D08873
- ChEBI: CHEBI:140421
- ChEMBL: ChEMBL512351
- CompTox Dashboard (EPA): DTXSID10954727
- ECHA InfoCard: 100.207.746

Chemical and physical data
- Formula: C_{23}H_{22}ClN_{5}O_{3}
- Molar mass: 451.91 g·mol^{−1}
- 3D model (JSmol): Interactive image
- SMILES: CN(C)C(=N)C1=CC=C(C=C1)C(=O)NC2=C(C=C(C=C2)OC)C(=O)NC3=NC=C(C=C3)Cl
- InChI: InChI=1S/C23H22ClN5O3/c1-29(2)21(25)14-4-6-15(7-5-14)22(30)27-19-10-9-17(32-3)12-18(19)23(31)28-20-11-8-16(24)13-26-20/h4-13,25H,1-3H3,(H,27,30)(H,26,28,31); Key:XHOLNRLADUSQLD-UHFFFAOYSA-N

Betrixaban (trade name Bevyxxa) is an oral anticoagulant drug which acts as a direct factor Xa inhibitor. Betrixaban is FDA approved for venous thrombosis prevention in adults hospitalized for an acute illness who are at risk for thromboembolic complications. Compared to other directly acting oral anticoagulants betrixaban has relatively low renal excretion and is not metabolized by CYP3A4.

== History ==
Betrixaban was originally developed by Millennium Pharmaceuticals. Portola Pharmaceuticals acquired rights for betrixaban in 2004 and co-developed it with Merck. In 2011 Merck discontinued joint development.

The drug has undergone clinical trials for prevention of embolism after knee surgery and for prevention of stroke following non-valvular atrial fibrillation. Betrixaban was also studied in a large phase III clinical trial for extended duration thromboprophylaxis in acute ill patients. Previously apixaban and rivaroxaban have failed to show positive risk/benefit ratio in this indication compared to enoxaparin. APEX trial compared betrixaban with enoxaparin and included 7513 patients. Lower rate of VTE events was found in betrixaban arm with no increase in major bleedings compared to enoxaparin. Based on these results betrixaban was approved by FDA on June 23, 2017, becoming the first DOAC approved for extended prophylaxis in hospitalized patients.

Betrixaban has been also reviewed by EMA but didn't receive marketing approval in EU mainly due to concerns of increased bleeding risk and absence of reversal agent.

== See also ==
- Edoxaban
- Enoxaparin
