= SAMe-TT2R2 score =

The SAMe-TT_{2}R_{2} score is a clinical prediction rule to predict the quality of vitamin K antagonist anticoagulation therapy as measured by time in therapeutic INR range (TTR) (VKA e.g. warfarin). It has been suggested that it can aid in the medical decision making between VKAs and new oral anticoagulant/non-VKA oral anticoagulant (NOAC e.g. dabigatran, rivaroxaban, apixaban or edoxaban) in patients with atrial fibrillation (AF). This score can be used with patients with ≥1 additional stroke risk factors using the CHA2DS2-VASc score, where oral anticoagulation is recommended or should be considered.

This score reflects the need to offer an improved patient care pathway when using oral anticoagulants. While NOACs avoid the need for drug monitoring (e.g. INR monitoring), they have an unstable bioavailability and are not indicated for patients with chronic kidney failure or in patients with valvular replacement surgery.

In a newly diagnosed non-anticoagulated AF patient, the physician may avoid a ‘trial of warfarin’ (which may expose patients to increased stroke risk during the initial inception phase, with suboptimal anticoagulation control) and make an informed decision between patients likely to do well on a VKA (SAMe-TT_{2}R_{2} score 0–2) or where a VKA is perhaps likely to be associated with poor quality anticoagulation control.

== Calculate the SAMe-TT_{2}R_{2} score ==
Condition/influencing factor	Points
Sex (female)	1
Age (<60 years)	1
Medical history (history of more than two of the following: hypertension, diabetes, CAD, PAD, heart failure, stroke; pulmonary, hepatic, or renal disease)	1
Treatment (interacting medications e.g. amiodarone)	1
Tobacco use (within 2 years)	2
Race (non-Caucasian)	2

Using the above table add together points assigned for different factors to a maximum score of 8.

== Results ==
Score result	Action (Untested)
0-2	Patients are likely to achieve a high TTR (e.g. >65%) so initiating with a VKA is likely beneficial.
>2	Improve education regarding anticoagulation control (e.g. a structured educational programme) or select a NOAC would be better initial options.

== See also ==
- CHA2DS2-VASc score
