= Portola Pharmaceuticals =

American clinical stage biotechnology company

- Company type: Public
- Traded as: Nasdaq: PTLA; Russell 2000 Index component
- Industry: Pharmaceuticals
- Founded: 2003; 23 years ago
- Founders: Charles J. Homcy; David R. Philips
- Fate: Acquired by Alexion Pharmaceuticals
- Headquarters: South San Francisco, California, United States
- Area served: Worldwide
- Key people: Scott Garland (CEO)
- Products: Andexxa; Bevyxxa; Cerdulatinib
- Revenue: $40,130 (2018)
- Number of employees: 324 (2018)
- Subsidiaries: Portola Pharma UK Limited
- Website: portola.com

Portola Pharmaceuticals is an American clinical stage biotechnology company that researches, develops, and commercializes drugs. The company focuses primarily on drugs used in the treatment of thrombosis and hematological malignancies. Founded in 2003 and headquartered in South San Francisco, California, Portola Pharmaceuticals is a member of the NASDAQ Biotechnology Index.

In May 2020, Alexion Pharmaceuticals and Portola announced that they had entered into a definitive merger agreement for Alexion to acquire Portola.

== History ==
The company was founded on September 2, 2003, and named after Gaspar de Portolà, who was the first European to see San Francisco Bay. It completed an IPO on NASDAQ in May 2013.

The company developed P2Y_{12} inhibitor Elinogrel, transferring rights to Novartis in 2009. The rights were returned in 2012 to Portola, which decided not to continue development.

Portola Pharmaceuticals has collaboration agreements with SRX Cardio, Dermavant, Millennium Pharmaceuticals, Daiichi Sankyo, Bayer, Janssen, BMS, and Pfizer.

In the class action lawsuit of Hayden v. Portola Pharmaceuticals in U.S. District Court, in the Northern District of California, before U.S. District Judge Vince Chhabria, plaintiffs sued under Section 11 of the Securities Act of 1933 alleging that the company and its underwriters misrepresented its financial position ahead of a 2019 securities offering. In November 2022, Judge Chhabria entered an order granting preliminary approval of the proposed settlement of the case in the proposed settlement amount of $17.5 million.

== Products ==
- Andexanet alfa (Andexxa), a coagulation factor Xa (recombinant), inactivated-zhzo, the first and only antidote for patients treated with the new oral anticoagulants (NOACs) rivaroxaban and apixaban when a reversal of anticoagulation is required due to life-threatening or uncontrolled bleeding. Andexanet is not indicated for the treatment of bleeding related to any FXa inhibitors other than apixaban and rivaroxaban. Approved by FDA in May 2018. In February 2019, the European CHMP of EMA recommended the granting of a conditional marketing authorisation for Andexanet alfa (in EU: Ondexxya). In April 2019 the European Commission granted the authorisation (approved) Andexanet for the 28 countries of the EU.
- Betrixaban (Bevyxxa), an oral direct FXa inhibitor for prevention of thrombosis; approved by FDA in June 2017.
- Cerdulatinib, an investigational - not approved - oral multikinase SYK/JAK inhibitor for hematological malignancies and topical use; granted Orphan drug status for PTCL by FDA in September 2018.
