= Otamixaban =

Chemical compound

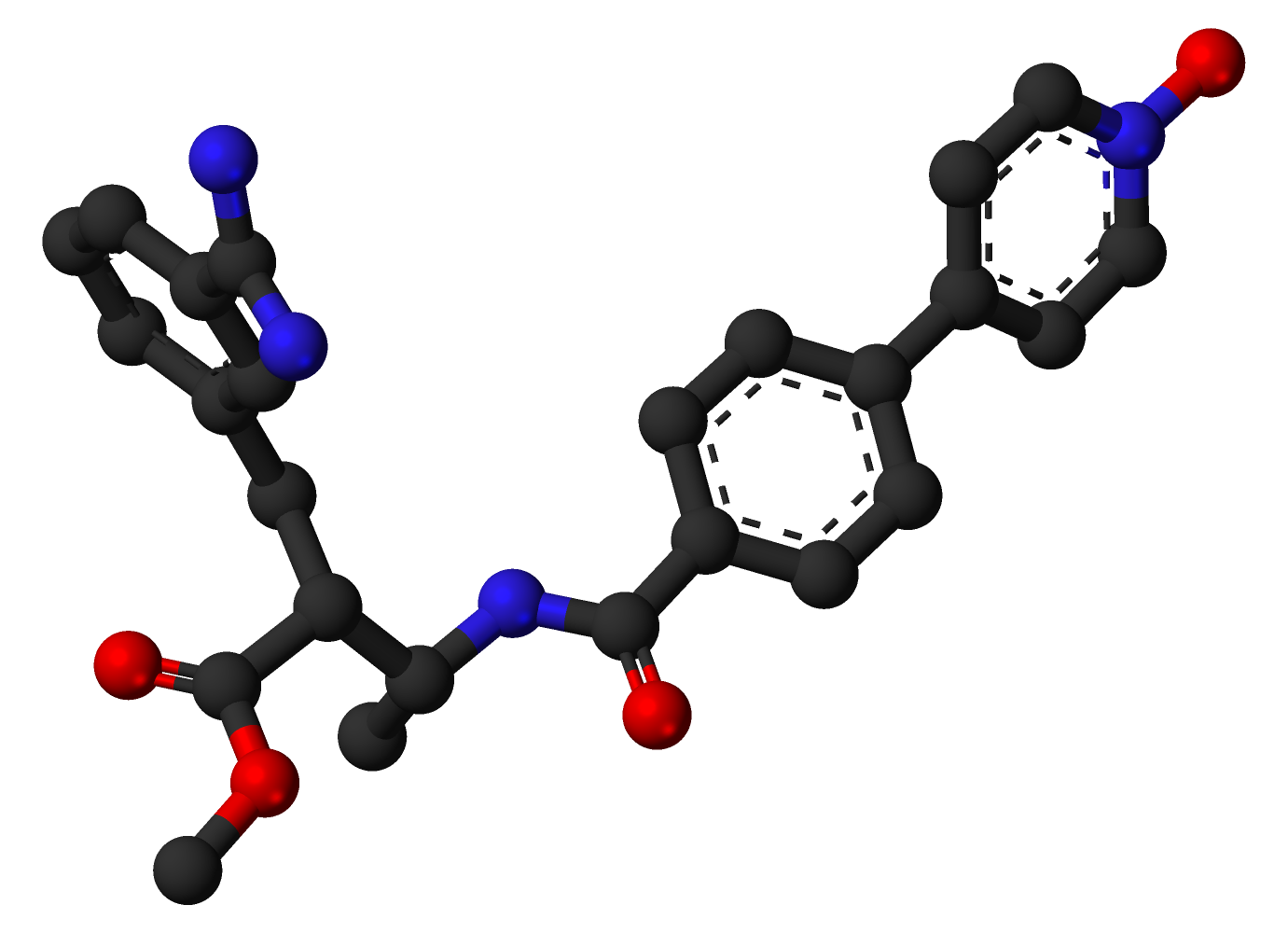

Clinical data
- ATC code: none

Identifiers
- IUPAC name: Methyl (2R,3R)-2-{3-[amino(imino)methyl]benzyl}-3-{[4-(1-oxidopyridin-4-yl)benzoyl]amino}butanoate
- CAS Number: 193153-04-7
- PubChem CID: 5496659
- ChemSpider: 4593439
- UNII: S173RED00L
- ChEMBL: ChEMBL46618
- CompTox Dashboard (EPA): DTXSID40172917

Chemical and physical data
- Formula: C_{25}H_{26}N_{4}O_{4}
- Molar mass: 446.507 g·mol^{−1}
- 3D model (JSmol): Interactive image
- SMILES: O=C(OC)[C@H](Cc1cc(C(=[N@H])N)ccc1)[C@H](NC(=O)c3ccc(c2cc[n+]([O-])cc2)cc3)C
- InChI: InChI=1S/C25H26N4O4/c1-16(22(25(31)33-2)15-17-4-3-5-21(14-17)23(26)27)28-24(30)20-8-6-18(7-9-20)19-10-12-29(32)13-11-19/h3-14,16,22H,15H2,1-2H3,(H3,26,27)(H,28,30)/t16-,22-/m1/s1; Key:PFGVNLZDWRZPJW-OPAMFIHVSA-N

Otamixaban (INN) is an experimental injectable anticoagulant direct factor Xa inhibitor that was investigated for the treatment for acute coronary syndrome. In 2013, Sanofi announced that it had ended development of the drug candidate after poor performance in a Phase III clinical trial.
