= Direct factor Xa inhibitors =

Blood thinning drugs

Direct factor Xa inhibitor
- Drug class

Class identifiers
- Synonyms: Direct Xa inhibitor, novel oral anticoagulant
- Use: Treat and prevent venous thromboembolism
- Mechanism of action: Inhibit fibrin formation in the final common pathway of the coagulation cascade
- Chemical class: Direct factor Xa inhibitors

Legal status

Direct factor Xa inhibitors (xabans) are anticoagulants (blood thinning drugs), used to both treat and prevent blood clots in veins, and prevent stroke and embolism in people with atrial fibrillation.

== Medical use ==
Direct factor Xa inhibitors include rivaroxaban, apixaban and edoxaban, and are types of direct oral anticoagulant (DOAC), which are blood thinning drugs, one of the classes of antithrombotic drugs. They are commonly prescribed to treat and prevent blood clots in veins, prevent stroke and embolism in people with non-valvular atrial fibrillation (AF) who have other risk factors, and prevent blood clots after routine knee and hip replacement surgery.

Direct factor Xa inhibitors can be considered as an alternative to warfarin, particularly if a person is on several other medications that interact with warfarin, or if attending medical appointments and laboratory monitoring becomes difficult. Factors considered before deciding on whether warfarin or a DOAC or which direct factor Xa inhibitor is used, include: the presence or absence of valvular heart disease, state of kidney function, the risk of stroke and the risk of bleeding.

== Contraindications ==
Direct Xa inhibitors are contraindicated in people who are actively bleeding or who are at high risk of bleeding. The effects on a fetus or neonate are unknown, hence these drugs are not prescribed in pregnancy or breast feeding mothers.

== Adverse effects ==
Side effects may include bleeding, most commonly from the nose, gastrointestinal tract (GI) or genitourinary system. Compared to the risk of bleeding with warfarin use, direct factor Xa inhibitors have a higher risk of GI bleeding, but lower risk of bleeding in the brain. Other side effects may include stomach upset, dizziness, anemia or increased blood levels of liver enzymes.

== Overdose ==
A specialist may request a quantitative factor Xa assay in a situation of overdose. Andexanet alfa, a specific antidote to reverse the anticoagulant activity of direct Xa inhibitors in the event of major bleeding, was approved by the FDA in 2018. It is also available in the UK.

== Drug interactions ==
The risk of bleeding is increased if used at the same time as other blood thinning drugs such as nonsteroidal anti-inflammatory drugs, antiplatelet drugs and heparin. The blood thinning effects can be reduced if used at the same time as rifampicin and phenytoin, and increased with fluconazole. Compared to warfarin they have fewer interactions with other medications.

== Pharmacology ==
=== Mechanism of action ===
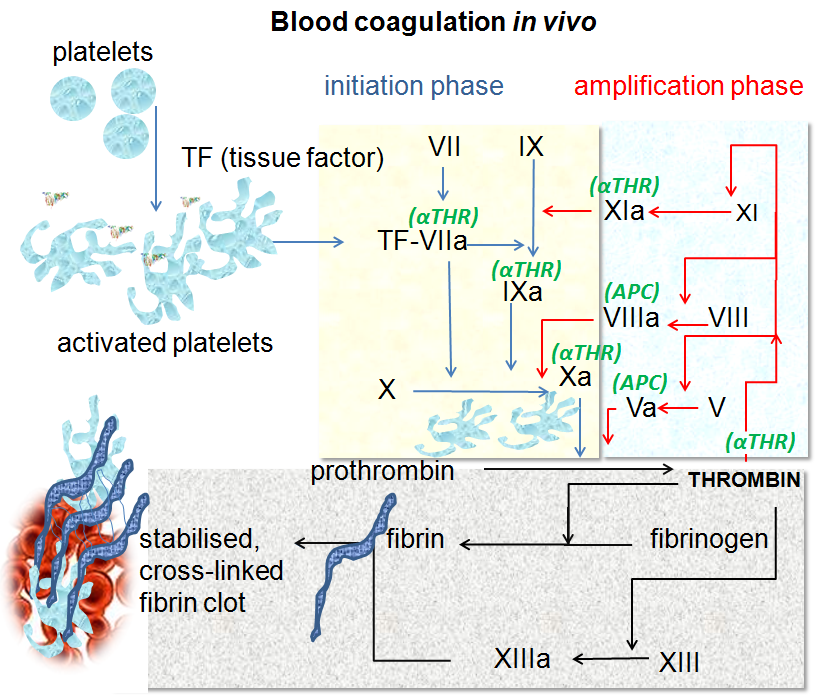
Coagulation in vivo, shows final common pathway and where factor Xa acts

Direct factor Xa inhibitors block the enzyme called factor Xa, preventing the conversion of prothrombin to thrombin in the final common pathway of clot formation in veins and the heart.

=== Pharmacokinetics ===
They have a rapid onset and offset of action. This means it is often possible to pause them 12 to 48 hours before surgery and resume them shortly after the surgery. By contrast, warfarin and phenprocoumon are often paused up to a week before surgery, and low-molecular-weight heparins are used to "bridge" the therapy gap, typically for several weeks.

Also in contrast to warfarin and phenprocoumon, direct factor Xa inhibitors do not require frequent monitoring of the prothrombin time (also called the INR) and dose adjustments.

== History ==
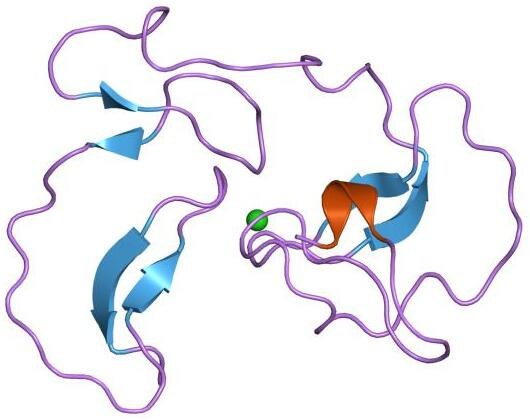
Antistasin, the first discovered naturally occurring direct Xa inhibitor

Rivaroxaban, the first synthetic direct Xa inhibitor marketed as a drug

Prior to the introduction of direct factor Xa inhibitors, vitamin K antagonists such as warfarin were the only oral anticoagulants for over 60 years, and together with heparin have been the main blood thinners in use. People admitted to hospital requiring blood thinning were started on an infusion of heparin infusion, which thinned blood immediately, and were then discharged from the hospital after almost a week on warfarin, which takes time to work. The ability to have a shorter stay in hospital came with the advent of low molecular weight heparin (LMWH) and the ability of self-injecting subcutaneously at home. Biotechnology developments then paved way for the first successful synthetic anticoagulants including hirudin. The monitoring of warfarin and keeping the international normalized ratio (INR) between 2.0 and 3.0, along with avoiding over and under treatment, has driven a search for an alternative.

A naturally occurring inhibitor of factor Xa was reported in 1971 by Spellman et al. from the dog hookworm. In 1987, Tuszynski et al. discovered antistasin, which was isolated from the extracts of the Mexican leech, Haementeria officinalis. Later, another naturally occurring inhibitor, tick anticoagulant peptide (TAP) was isolated from the extract of tick Ornithodoros moubata. Trials subsequently demonstrated efficacy and safety against warfarin for stroke prevention in AF and against LMWH for treatment and prevention of VTE including in people undergoing hip or knee replacement.

== Society and culture ==
=== Economics ===
The cost of direct Xa inhibitors can reach more than 50 times that of warfarin, although this difference may be offset by lower monitoring costs.

=== Brand names ===
Brands include rivaroxaban (brand name Xarelto) from Bayer, apixaban (Eliquis) from Bristol-Myers Squibb, edoxaban (Lixiana) from Daiichi, and betrixaban (Bevyxxa) from Portola Pharmaceuticals.

=== Discontinued xabans ===
Xabans that never reached the market include darexaban (YM150) from Astellas, otamixaban from Sanofi, letaxaban (TAK-442) from Takeda, and eribaxaban (PD0348292) from Pfizer.
