= Elinogrel =

Chemical compound

Clinical data
- Other names: PRT-060128
- Routes of administration: By mouth, IV
- ATC code: None

Legal status
- Legal status: Development terminated

Pharmacokinetic data
- Metabolism: Mainly unchanged, ~15% N-demethylation
- Excretion: Urine, faeces

Identifiers
- IUPAC name: N-[(5-Chlorothiophen-2-yl)sulfonyl]-N′-{4-[6-fluoro-7-(methylamino)-2,4-dioxo-1,4-dihydroquinazolin-3(2H)-yl]phenyl}urea
- CAS Number: 936500-94-6
- PubChem CID: 16066663
- ChemSpider: 17226246
- UNII: 915Y8E749J
- KEGG: D09607
- CompTox Dashboard (EPA): DTXSID50918262

Chemical and physical data
- Formula: C_{20}H_{15}ClFN_{5}O_{5}S_{2}
- Molar mass: 523.94 g·mol^{−1}
- 3D model (JSmol): Interactive image
- SMILES: CNC1=C(C=C2C(=C1)NC(=O)N(C2=O)C3=CC=C(C=C3)NC(=O)NS(=O)(=O)C4=CC=C(S4)Cl)F
- InChI: InChI=1S/C20H15ClFN5O5S2/c1-23-15-9-14-12(8-13(15)22)18(28)27(20(30)25-14)11-4-2-10(3-5-11)24-19(29)26-34(31,32)17-7-6-16(21)33-17/h2-9,23H,1H3,(H,25,30)(H2,24,26,29); Key:LGSDFTPAICUONK-UHFFFAOYSA-N

Elinogrel (INN, USAN) was an experimental antiplatelet drug acting as a P2Y_{12} inhibitor. Similarly to ticagrelor and in contrast to clopidogrel, elinogrel was a reversible inhibitor that acted fast and short (for about 12 hours), and it was not a prodrug but pharmacologically active itself. The substance was used in form of its potassium salt, intravenously for acute treatment and orally for long-term treatment. Development was terminated in 2012.

== History ==
The substance was originally developed by Portola Pharmaceuticals, with Phase II clinical trials conducted around 2008–2011. In February 2009, Novartis bought worldwide rights to develop it further, intending to conduct Phase III studies and commercialise the drug. The development of the drug was terminated in January 2012 by Novartis.
