= Darexaban =

Names
- Preferred IUPAC name N-[2-Hydroxy-6-(4-methoxybenzamido)phenyl]-4-(4-methyl-1,4-diazepan-1-yl)benzamide
- Other names YM150

Identifiers
CAS Number	365462-23-3; 365462-24-4 (maleate)
3D model (JSmol)	Interactive image
ChemSpider	8088422
PubChem CID	9912771
UNII	KF322K101S; 03RTP2436R (maleate)
CompTox Dashboard (EPA)	DTXSID101030146
- InChI: InChI=1S/C27H30N4O4/c1-30-15-4-16-31(18-17-30)21-11-7-19(8-12-21)27(34)29-25-23(5-3-6-24(25)32)28-26(33)20-9-13-22(35-2)14-10-20/h3,5-14,32H,4,15-18H2,1-2H3,(H,28,33)(H,29,34) Key: IJNIQYINMSGIPS-UHFFFAOYSA-N; InChI=1/C27H30N4O4/c1-30-15-4-16-31(18-17-30)21-11-7-19(8-12-21)27(34)29-25-23(5-3-6-24(25)32)28-26(33)20-9-13-22(35-2)14-10-20/h3,5-14,32H,4,15-18H2,1-2H3,(H,28,33)(H,29,34) Key: IJNIQYINMSGIPS-UHFFFAOYAJ
- SMILES: O=C(c1ccc(OC)cc1)Nc2cccc(O)c2NC(=O)c4ccc(N3CCCN(C)CC3)cc4

Properties
Chemical formula	C_{27}H_{30}N_{4}O_{4}
Molar mass	474.561 g·mol^{−1}
- Except where otherwise noted, data are given for materials in their standard state (at 25 °C [77 °F], 100 kPa). Infobox references

Darexaban (YM150) is a direct inhibitor of factor Xa created by Astellas Pharma. It is an experimental drug that acts as an anticoagulant and antithrombotic to prevent venous thromboembolism after a major orthopaedic surgery, stroke in patients with atrial fibrillation and possibly ischemic events in acute coronary syndrome. The development of darexaban was discontinued in September 2011.

== Clinical uses ==
=== Atrial fibrillation ===
Atrial fibrillation is an abnormal heart rhythm that causes a reduction in the cardiac output and blood flow to the brain. It also promotes the formation of blood clots in the atrial chambers of the heart. Atrial fibrillation is associated with an increased risk of embolic stroke due to the increased risk of blood clot development. Oral anticoagulant drugs such as Darexaban decrease the incidence and severity of stroke in patients with atrial fibrillation by preventing the formation of blood clots.

== Contraindictions ==
The RUBY-1 phase II trial results show that oral administration of darexaban in combination with the standard dual antiplatelet therapy used for acute coronary syndrome (ACS) patients caused a two- to four-fold increase in bleeding rates and no effect on ACS. Though there were no cases of fatal bleeding or intracranial haemorrhage, the results of this study questions the concept of adding an oral anticoagulant to standard of care dual antiplatelet therapy in order to prevent recurrent ischemic events after ACS. The development of darexaban was discontinued in September 2011.

== Pharmacology ==
=== Mechanism of action ===
Factor Xa (FXa) is an essential blood coagulation factor that is responsible for the initiation of the coagulation cascade. FXa cleaves prothrombin to its active form thrombin, which then acts to convert soluble fibrinogen to insoluble fibrin and to activate platelets. Stabilization of the platelet aggregation by fibrin mesh ultimately leads to clot formation.

Darexaban and darexaban glucuronide selectively and competitively inhibit FXa, suppressing prothrombin activity at the sites of blood clot (thrombus) formation. This leads to a decrease in blood clot formation in a dose dependent manner. Reducing blood clot formation will decrease blood flow blockages, thus possibly lowering the risk of myocardial infarction, unstable angina, venous thrombosis, and ischemic stroke.

=== Pharmacokinetics ===
Darexaban is rapidly absorbed and extensively metabolized in the liver to its active metabolite, darexaban glucuronide (YM-222714) during first pass metabolism via glucuronidation. The metabolism of darexaban also occurs in the small intestine but to a much lesser extent. Glucuronidation of darexaban occurs quickly, thus the half-life of darexaban itself is short. However, the resultant darexaban glucuronide metabolite has a long half-life of approximately 14–18 hours, reaching its maximum levels in the blood 1–1.5 hours post dose. As a result, darexaban glucuronide is the main determinant of the antithrombotic effects. Darexaban shows minimal interaction with food and is excreted through the kidneys (urine) and feces.
