= HAS-BLED =

HAS-BLED score
- Purpose: risk of major bleeding

HAS-BLED is a scoring system developed to assess 1-year risk of major bleeding in people taking anticoagulants for atrial fibrillation (AF). It was developed in 2010 with data from 3,978 people in the Euro Heart Survey. Major bleeding is defined as being intracranial bleedings, hospitalization, hemoglobin decrease > 2 g/dL, and/or transfusion.

== Definition ==
HAS-BLED is a medical tool used to calculate the one-year risk of major bleeding for people on blood thinning drugs for atrial fibrillation (AF). It is used with the CHA_{2}DS_{2}-VASc score.

== Use ==
	Condition	Points
H	Hypertension: (uncontrolled, >160 mmHg systolic)	1
A	Abnormal renal function: Dialysis, transplant, Cr >2.26 mg/dL or >200 μmol/L Abnormal liver function: Cirrhosis or Bilirubin >2x Normal or AST/ALT/AP >3x Normal	1 1
S	Stroke: Prior history of stroke	1
B	Bleeding: Prior Major Bleeding or Predisposition to Bleeding	1
L	Labile INR: (Unstable/high INR), Time in Therapeutic Range < 60%	1
E	Elderly: Age > 65 years	1
D	Prior Alcohol or Drug Usage History (≥ 8 drinks/week) Medication Usage Predisposing to Bleeding: (Antiplatelet agents, NSAIDs)	1 1

A calculated HAS-BLED score is between 0 and 9 and based on seven parameters with a weighted value of 0-2.

The HAS-BLED mnemonic stands for:

- Hypertension
- Abnormal renal and liver function
- Stroke
- Bleeding
- Labile INR
- Elderly
- Drugs or alcohol

A study comparing HEMORR2HAGES, ATRIA and HAS-BLED showed superior performance of the HAS-BLED score compared to the other two. Mixed evidence exist on the comparison between GARFIELD-AF bleeding score over the HAS-BLED.

2020 ESC guidelines on atrial fibrillation recommend assessment of bleeding risk in AF using the HAS-BLED bleeding risk schema as a simple, easy calculation, whereby a score of ≥3 indicates "high risk" and some caution and regular review of the patient is needed. The HAS-BLED score has also been validated in an anticoagulated trial cohort of 7329 people with AF - in this study, the HAS-BLED score offered some improvement in predictive capability for bleeding risk over previously published bleeding risk assessment schemas and was simpler to apply. With the likely availability of new oral anticoagulants that avoid the limitations of warfarin (and may even be safer), more widespread use of oral anticoagulation therapy for stroke prevention in AF is likely.

While their use is recommended in clinical practice guidelines, they are only moderately effective in predicting bleeding risk and don't perform well in predicting hemorrhagic stroke. Bleeding risk may be increased in patients on haemodialysis.

== Score ==
A score of ≥3 indicates "high risk", but does not necessarily mean that an anticoagulant cannot be given, as some risk factors may be modified.
