= Venous thrombosis =

Blood clot (thrombus) that forms within a vein

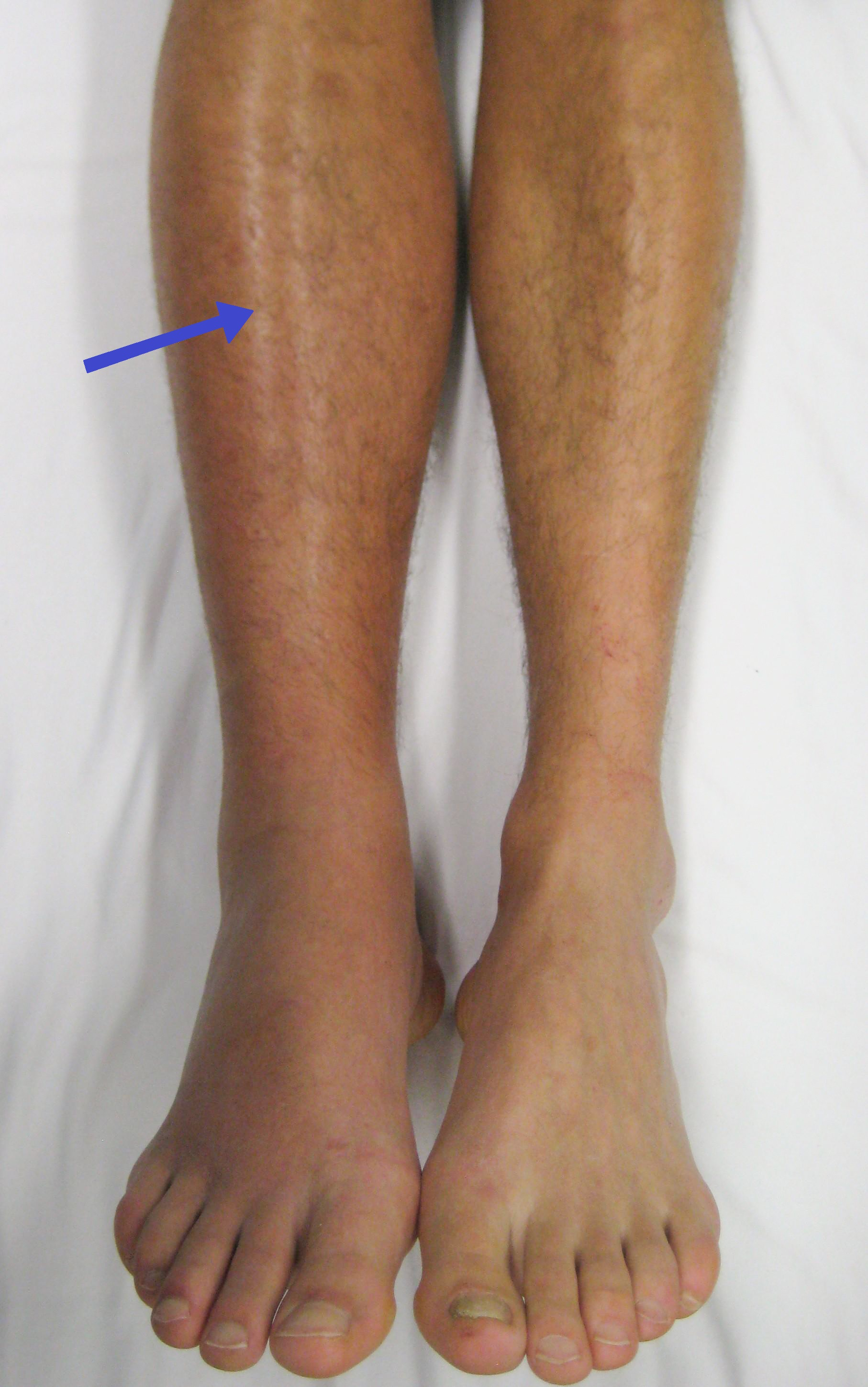
- A deep vein thrombosis in the right leg. There is striking redness and swelling.
- Specialty: Hematology, pulmonology, cardiology
- Frequency: 1-2 per 1,000 per year

Venous thrombosis is the blockage of a vein caused by a thrombus (blood clot). A common form of venous thrombosis is deep vein thrombosis (DVT), when a blood clot forms in the deep veins. If a thrombus breaks off (embolizes) and flows to the lungs to lodge there, it becomes a pulmonary embolism (PE), a blood clot in the lungs. The conditions of DVT only, DVT with PE, and PE only, are all captured by the term venous thromboembolism (VTE).

The initial treatment for VTE is typically either low-molecular-weight heparin (LMWH) or unfractionated heparin, or increasingly with direct acting oral anticoagulants (DOAC). Those initially treated with heparins can be switched to other anticoagulants (warfarin, DOACs), although pregnant women and some people with cancer receive ongoing heparin treatment. Superficial venous thrombosis or phlebitis affects the superficial veins of the upper or lower extremity and only require anticoagulation in specific situations, and may be treated with anti-inflammatory pain relief only.

There are other less common forms of venous thrombosis, some of which can also lead to pulmonary embolism. Venous thromboembolism and superficial vein thrombosis account for about 90% of venous thrombosis. Other rarer forms include retinal vein thrombosis, mesenteric vein thrombosis (affecting veins draining blood from the gastrointestinal organs), cerebral venous sinus thrombosis, renal vein thrombosis, and ovarian vein thrombosis.

== Classification ==
=== Common forms ===
Superficial venous thromboses cause discomfort but generally not serious consequences, as do the deep vein thromboses (DVTs) that form in the deep veins of the legs or in the pelvic veins. Nevertheless, they can progress to the deep veins through the perforator veins, or they can be responsible for a lung embolism mainly if the head of the clot is poorly attached to the vein wall and is situated near the sapheno-femoral junction.

When a blood clot breaks loose and travels in the blood, this is called a thromboembolism. The abbreviation DVT/PE refers to a VTE where a deep vein thrombosis (DVT) has moved to the lungs (PE or pulmonary embolism).

Since the veins return blood to the heart, if a piece of a blood clot formed in a vein breaks off it can be transported to the right side of the heart, and from there into the lungs. A piece of thrombus that is transported in this way is an embolus: the process of forming a thrombus that becomes embolic is called a thromboembolism. An embolism that lodges in the lungs is a pulmonary embolism (PE). A pulmonary embolism is a very serious condition that can be fatal depending on the dimensions of the embolus.

=== Rare forms ===
While venous thrombosis of the legs is the most common form, venous thrombosis may occur in other veins. These may have particular specific risk factors:

- Cerebral venous sinus thrombosis, cavernous sinus thrombosis and jugular vein thrombosis: thrombosis of the veins of the brain and head
- Central retinal vein occlusion and branch retinal vein occlusion: despite the name these conditions have much more in common with arterial thrombosis and are not treated with anticoagulants
- Paget–Schroetter disease: thrombosis of the veins of the arms (axillary and subclavian veins)
- Budd-Chiari syndrome (thrombosis of the hepatic vein)
- Thrombosis of the hepatic portal system, also known as splanchnic venous thrombosis:
  - Thrombosis of the superior mesenteric vein, which may cause mesenteric ischemia (insufficient blood flow to the intestine)
  - Portal vein thrombosis
  - Thrombosis of the splenic vein
- Renal vein thrombosis (thrombosis of the veins of the kidneys)
- Ovarian vein thrombosis

=== Parodoxical embolism ===
Systemic embolism of venous origin can occur in patients with an atrial or ventricular septal defect, or an arteriovenous connection in the lung, through which an embolus may pass into the arterial system. Such an event is termed a paradoxical embolism. When this affects the blood vessels of the brain it can cause stroke.

== Causes ==
Venous thrombi are caused mainly by a combination of venous stasis and hypercoagulability—but to a lesser extent endothelial damage and activation. The three factors of stasis, hypercoagulability, and alterations in the blood vessel wall represent Virchow's triad, and changes to the vessel wall are the least understood. Various risk factors increase the likelihood of any one individual developing a thrombosis:

=== Risk factors ===
==== Acquired ====
- Older age
- Major surgery, orthopedic surgery, neurosurgery
- Cancers, most particularly pancreatic, but not cancers of the lip, oral cavity, and pharynx
- Immobilization, as in orthopedic casts, the sitting position, and travel, particularly by air
- Pregnancy and the postpartum period
- Antiphospholipid syndrome (such as lupus anticoagulant)
- Trauma and minor leg injury
- Previous VTE
- Oral contraceptives
- Hormonal replacement therapy, esp. oral
- Central venous catheters
- Inflammatory diseases/some autoimmune diseases
- Nephrotic syndrome
- Obesity
- Infection
- HIV
- Myeloproliferative neoplasms including essential thrombocytosis and polycythemia vera
- Chemotherapy
- Heart failure

==== Inherited ====
- Antithrombin deficiency
- Protein C deficiency
- Protein S deficiency (type I)
- Factor V Leiden
- Prothrombin G20210A
- Dysfibrinogenemia
- Non O-blood type

==== Mixed ====
- Low free protein S
- Activated protein C resistance
- High factor VIII levels
- Hyperhomocysteinemia
- High fibrinogen levels
- High factor IX levels
- High factor XI levels

The overall absolute risk of venous thrombosis per 100,000 woman years in current use of combined oral contraceptives is approximately 60, compared to 30 in non-users. The risk of thromboembolism varies with different types of birth control pills; Compared with combined oral contraceptives containing levonorgestrel (LNG), and with the same dose of estrogen and duration of use, the rate ratio of deep vein thrombosis for combined oral contraceptives with norethisterone is 0.98, with norgestimate 1.19, with desogestrel (DSG) 1.82, with gestodene 1.86, with drospirenone (DRSP) 1.64, and with cyproterone acetate 1.88. Venous thromboembolism occurs in 100–200 per 100,000 pregnant women every year.

During antepartum and postpartum the patient is in a hyper-coagulable state caused by anatomical and hematological reasons. However, during postpartum the risk is increased three-fold as compared to the nine months of pregnancy. Hypercoagulability (also known as thrombophilia) is the increased chances for blood to clot. It is normal for the body to produce blood clots in the event of bleeding. Hypercoagulability can produce clots when it is not necessary and will be dangerous for the patient. The clots can be arterial or venous. Heart attacks and strokes are caused by arterial thromboses, while deep vein thrombosis and pulmonary embolism are caused by venous thromboses.

Regarding family history, age has substantial effect modification. For people with two or more affected siblings, the highest incidence rate is found among those ≥70 years of age (390 per 100,000 in men and 370 per 100,000 in women), whereas the highest incidence ratios compared to those without affected siblings occurred at much younger ages (ratio of 4.3 among men 20 to 29 years of age and 5.5 among women 10 to 19 years of age).

Risk of venous thromboembolism (VTE) with hormone therapy and birth control (QResearch/CPRD)
Type	Route	Medications	Odds ratio (95% CI)
Menopausal hormone therapy	Oral	Estradiol alone ≤1 mg/day >1 mg/day	1.27 (1.16–1.39)*; 1.22 (1.09–1.37)*; 1.35 (1.18–1.55)*
Menopausal hormone therapy	Oral	Conjugated estrogens alone ≤0.625 mg/day >0.625 mg/day	1.49 (1.39–1.60)*; 1.40 (1.28–1.53)*; 1.71 (1.51–1.93)*
Menopausal hormone therapy	Oral	Estradiol/medroxyprogesterone acetate	1.44 (1.09–1.89)*
Menopausal hormone therapy	Oral	Estradiol/dydrogesterone ≤1 mg/day E2 >1 mg/day E2	1.18 (0.98–1.42); 1.12 (0.90–1.40); 1.34 (0.94–1.90)
Menopausal hormone therapy	Oral	Estradiol/norethisterone ≤1 mg/day E2 >1 mg/day E2	1.68 (1.57–1.80)*; 1.38 (1.23–1.56)*; 1.84 (1.69–2.00)*
Menopausal hormone therapy	Oral	Estradiol/norgestrel or estradiol/drospirenone	1.42 (1.00–2.03)
Menopausal hormone therapy	Oral	Conjugated estrogens/medroxyprogesterone acetate	2.10 (1.92–2.31)*
Menopausal hormone therapy	Oral	Conjugated estrogens/norgestrel ≤0.625 mg/day CEEs >0.625 mg/day CEEs	1.73 (1.57–1.91)*; 1.53 (1.36–1.72)*; 2.38 (1.99–2.85)*
Menopausal hormone therapy	Oral	Tibolone alone	1.02 (0.90–1.15)
Menopausal hormone therapy	Oral	Raloxifene alone	1.49 (1.24–1.79)*
Menopausal hormone therapy	Transdermal	Estradiol alone ≤50 μg/day >50 μg/day	0.96 (0.88–1.04); 0.94 (0.85–1.03); 1.05 (0.88–1.24)
Menopausal hormone therapy	Transdermal	Estradiol/progestogen	0.88 (0.73–1.01)
Menopausal hormone therapy	Vaginal	Estradiol alone	0.84 (0.73–0.97)
Menopausal hormone therapy	Vaginal	Conjugated estrogens alone	1.04 (0.76–1.43)
Combined birth control	Oral	Ethinylestradiol/norethisterone	2.56 (2.15–3.06)*
Combined birth control	Oral	Ethinylestradiol/levonorgestrel	2.38 (2.18–2.59)*
Combined birth control	Oral	Ethinylestradiol/norgestimate	2.53 (2.17–2.96)*
Combined birth control	Oral	Ethinylestradiol/desogestrel	4.28 (3.66–5.01)*
Combined birth control	Oral	Ethinylestradiol/gestodene	3.64 (3.00–4.43)*
Combined birth control	Oral	Ethinylestradiol/drospirenone	4.12 (3.43–4.96)*
Combined birth control	Oral	Ethinylestradiol/cyproterone acetate	4.27 (3.57–5.11)*
Notes: (1) Nested case–control studies (2015, 2019) based on data from the QResearch and Clinical Practice Research Datalink (CPRD) databases. (2) Bioidentical progesterone was not included, but is known to be associated with no additional risk relative to estrogen alone. Footnotes: * = Statistically significant (p < 0.01). Sources: See template.

Absolute and relative incidence of venous thromboembolism (VTE) during pregnancy and the postpartum period
Absolute incidence of first VTE per 10,000 person–years during pregnancy and the postpartum period
	Swedish data A		Swedish data B		English data		Danish data	
Time period	N	Rate (95% CI)	N	Rate (95% CI)	NФВяы	Rate (95% CI)	N	Rate (95% CI)
Outside pregnancy	1105	4.2 (4.0–4.4)	1015	3.8 (?)	1480	3.2 (3.0–3.3)	2895	3.6 (3.4–3.7)
Antepartum	995	20.5 (19.2–21.8)	690	14.2 (13.2–15.3)	156	9.9 (8.5–11.6)	491	10.7 (9.7–11.6)
Trimester 1	207	13.6 (11.8–15.5)	172	11.3 (9.7–13.1)	23	4.6 (3.1–7.0)	61	4.1 (3.2–5.2)
Trimester 2	275	17.4 (15.4–19.6)	178	11.2 (9.7–13.0)	30	5.8 (4.1–8.3)	75	5.7 (4.6–7.2)
Trimester 3	513	29.2 (26.8–31.9)	340	19.4 (17.4–21.6)	103	18.2 (15.0–22.1)	355	19.7 (17.7–21.9)
Around delivery	115	154.6 (128.8–185.6)	79	106.1 (85.1–132.3)	34	142.8 (102.0–199.8)	–	
Postpartum	649	42.3 (39.2–45.7)	509	33.1 (30.4–36.1)	135	27.4 (23.1–32.4)	218	17.5 (15.3–20.0)
Early postpartum	584	75.4 (69.6–81.8)	460	59.3 (54.1–65.0)	177	46.8 (39.1–56.1)	199	30.4 (26.4–35.0)
Late postpartum	65	8.5 (7.0–10.9)	49	6.4 (4.9–8.5)	18	7.3 (4.6–11.6)	319	3.2 (1.9–5.0)
Incidence rate ratios (IRRs) of first VTE during pregnancy and the postpartum period
	Swedish data A		Swedish data B		English data		Danish data	
Time period	IRR* (95% CI)		IRR* (95% CI)		IRR (95% CI)†		IRR (95% CI)†	
Outside pregnancy	Reference (i.e., 1.00)							
Antepartum	5.08 (4.66–5.54)		3.80 (3.44–4.19)		3.10 (2.63–3.66)		2.95 (2.68–3.25)	
Trimester 1	3.42 (2.95–3.98)		3.04 (2.58–3.56)		1.46 (0.96–2.20)		1.12 (0.86–1.45)	
Trimester 2	4.31 (3.78–4.93)		3.01 (2.56–3.53)		1.82 (1.27–2.62)		1.58 (1.24–1.99)	
Trimester 3	7.14 (6.43–7.94)		5.12 (4.53–5.80)		5.69 (4.66–6.95)		5.48 (4.89–6.12)	
Around delivery	37.5 (30.9–44.45)		27.97 (22.24–35.17)		44.5 (31.68–62.54)		–	
Postpartum	10.21 (9.27–11.25)		8.72 (7.83–9.70)		8.54 (7.16–10.19)		4.85 (4.21–5.57)	
Early postpartum	19.27 (16.53–20.21)		15.62 (14.00–17.45)		14.61 (12.10–17.67)		8.44 (7.27–9.75)	
Late postpartum	2.06 (1.60–2.64)		1.69 (1.26–2.25)		2.29 (1.44–3.65)		0.89 (0.53–1.39)	
Notes: Swedish data A = Using any code for VTE regardless of confirmation. Swedish data B = Using only algorithm-confirmed VTE. Early postpartum = First 6 weeks after delivery. Late postpartum = More than 6 weeks after delivery. * = Adjusted for age and calendar year. † = Unadjusted ratio calculated based on the data provided. Source:

== Pathophysiology ==
In contrast to the understanding for how arterial thromboses occur, as with heart attacks, venous thrombosis formation is not well understood. With arterial thrombosis, blood vessel wall damage is required for thrombosis formation, as it initiates coagulation, but the majority of venous thrombi form without any injured epithelium.

Red blood cells and fibrin are the main components of venous thrombi, and the thrombi appear to attach to the blood vessel wall endothelium, normally a non-thrombogenic surface, with fibrin. Platelets in venous thrombi attach to downstream fibrin, while in arterial thrombi, they compose the core. As a whole, platelets constitute less of venous thrombi when compared to arterial ones. The process is thought to be initiated by tissue factor-affected thrombin production, which leads to fibrin deposition.

The valves of veins are a recognized site of VT initiation. Due to the blood flow pattern, the base of the valve sinus is particularly deprived of oxygen (hypoxic). Stasis exacerbates hypoxia, and this state is linked to the activation of white blood cells (leukocytes) and the endothelium. Specifically, the two pathways of hypoxia-inducible factor-1 (HIF-1) and early growth response 1 (EGR-1) are activated by hypoxia, and they contribute to monocyte and endothelial activation. Hypoxia also causes reactive oxygen species (ROS) production that can activate HIF-1, EGR-1, and nuclear factor-κB (NF-κB), which regulates HIF-1 transcription.

HIF-1 and EGR-1 pathways lead to monocyte association with endothelial proteins, such as P-selectin, prompting monocytes to release tissue factor-filled microvesicles, which presumably initiate fibrin deposition (via thrombin) after binding the endothelial surface.

== Diagnosis ==
A provider uses multiple tools for the diagnosis of thromboembolism. They take a detailed medical history, assess the patient's symptoms and inspect the area of concern. Diagnostic testing tools include a blood test called a D-dimer. Elevated D-dimer levels can indicate a clot presence. This test is useful for ruling out a thromboembolism when other clinical indications are low. The standard upper limits of the test are 500 ng/ml, but there are guidelines to adjust based on the age of the patient. If clinical indications are high for acute thromboembolism, D-dimer testing should be bypassed and the provider should proceed with imaging.

Multiple imaging studies are available for diagnosis depending on the suspected location and type of thromboembolism. Ultrasound is used for the diagnosis of DVT. CT Pulmonary Angiography (CTPA) is the standard for the diagnosis of PE. Ventilation-perfusion (V/Q) scan can be used when CT is contraindicated, sums an allergy to iodinated contrast media. MR Angiography can be used for detecting clots in vessels in the abdomen and brain.

== Prevention ==
Numerous medications have been shown to reduce the risk of a person having a VTE; however, careful decision making is required in order to decide if a person's risk of having a VTE outweighs the risks associated with most thromboprophylaxis treatment approaches (medications to prevent venous thrombosis). It is recommended that people should be assessed at their hospital discharge for persistent high-risk of venous thrombosis and that people who adopt a heart-healthy lifestyle might lower their risk of venous thrombosis. Clinical policy from the American College of Physicians states a lack of support for any performance measures that incentivize physicians to apply universal prophylaxis without regard to the risks.

=== Surgery ===
Evidence supports the use of heparin in people following surgery who have a high risk of thrombosis to reduce the risk of DVTs; however, the effect on PEs or overall mortality is not known. In hospitalized non-surgical patients, mortality does not appear to change. It does not appear, however, to decrease the rate of symptomatic DVTs. Using both heparin and compression stockings appears better than either one alone in reducing the rate of DVT.

=== Non-surgical medical conditions ===
In hospitalized people who have had a stroke and not had surgery, mechanical measures (compression stockings) resulted in skin damage and no clinical improvement. Data on the effectiveness of compression stockings among hospitalized non-surgical patients without stroke is scarce.

The American College of Physicians (ACP) gave three strong recommendations with moderate quality evidence on VTE prevention in non-surgical patients:

- that hospitalized patients be assessed for their risk of thromboembolism and bleeding before prophylaxis (prevention);
- that heparin or a related drug is used if potential benefits are thought to outweigh potential harms;
- and that graduated compression stockings not be used.

In adults who have had their lower leg casted, braced, or otherwise immobilized for more than a week, LMWH may decrease the risk and severity of deep vein thrombosis, but does not have any effect on the incidence of pulmonary embolism.

=== Prior VTE ===
Following the completion of warfarin in those with prior VTE, the use of long-term aspirin has been shown to be beneficial.

=== Cancer ===
People who have cancer have a higher risk of VTE and may respond differently to anticoagulant preventative treatments and prevention measures. The American Society of Hematology strongly suggests that people undergoing chemotherapy for cancer who are at low risk of a VTE avoid medications to prevent thrombosis (thromboprophylaxis). For people undergoing chemotherapy for cancer that do not require a hospital stay (those undergoing ambulatory care), there is low certainty evidence to suggest that treatment with direct factor Xa inhibitors may help prevent symptomatic VTEs; however, this treatment approach may also lead to an increase in the risk of a major bleed compared to a placebo medication. There is stronger evidence to suggest that LMWH helps prevent symptomatic VTE; however, this treatment approach also comes with a higher risk of a major bleed compared to a placebo medication or no treatments to prevent VTE.

For people who are having surgery for cancer, it is recommended that they receive anticoagulation therapy (preferably LMWH) in order to prevent a VTE. LMWH is recommended for at least 7–10 days following cancer surgery, and for one month following surgery for people who have a high risk of VTEs.

Specifically for patients with various types of lymphoma, there is a risk assessment model, ThroLy, to help providers determine how likely a thromboembolic event is to occur.

== Treatment ==
American evidence-based clinical guidelines were published in 2016 for the treatment of VTE. In the UK, guidelines by the National Institute for Health and Care Excellence (NICE) were published in 2012, updated in 2020. These guidelines do not cover rare forms of thrombosis, for which an individualized approach is often needed. Central and branch retinal vein occlusion does not benefit from anticoagulation in the way that other venous thromboses do.

=== Anticoagulation ===
If diagnostic testing cannot be performed swiftly, many are commenced on empirical treatment. Traditionally this was heparin, but several of the DOACs are licensed for treatment without initial heparin use.

If heparin is used for initial treatment of VTE, fixed doses with low-molecular-weight heparin (LMWH) may be more effective than adjusted doses of unfractionated heparin (UFH) in reducing blood clots. No differences in mortality, prevention of major bleeding, or preventing VTEs from recurring were observed between LMWH and UFH. No differences have been detected in the route of administration of UFH (subcutaneous or intravenous). LMWH is usually administered by a subcutaneous injection, and a person's blood clotting factors do not have to be monitored as closely as with UFH.

Once the diagnosis is confirmed, a decision needs to be made about the nature of the ongoing treatment and its duration. USA recommendations for those without cancer include anticoagulation (medication that prevents further blood clots from forming) with the DOACs dabigatran, rivaroxaban, apixaban, or edoxaban rather than warfarin or low molecular weight heparin (LMWH).

For those with cancer, LMWH is recommended, although DOACs appear safe in the majority of situations. For long-term treatment in people with cancer, LMWH is probably more effective at reducing VTEs when compared to vitamin K antagonists. People with cancer have a higher risk of experiencing reoccurring VTE episodes ("recurrent VTE"), even while taking preventative anticoagulation medication. These people should be given therapeutic doses of LMWH medication, either by switching from another anticoagulant or by taking a higher dose of LMWH.

In pregnancy, warfarin and DOACs are not considered suitable and LMWH is recommended.

For those with a small pulmonary embolism and few risk factors, no anticoagulation is needed. Anticoagulation is, however, recommended in those who do have risk factors.

=== Thrombolysis ===
Thrombolysis is the administration of medication (a recombinant enzyme) that activates plasmin, the body's main enzyme that breaks down blood clots. This carries a risk of bleeding and is therefore reserved for those who have a form of thrombosis that may cause major complications. In pulmonary embolism, this applies in situations where heart function is compromised due to lack of blood flow through the lungs ("massive" or "high risk" pulmonary embolism), leading to low blood pressure. Deep vein thrombosis may require thrombolysis if there is a significant risk of post-thrombotic syndrome. Thrombolysis may be administered by intravenous catheter directly into the clot ("catheter-directed thrombolysis"); this requires a lower dose of the medication and may carry a lower bleeding risk but evidence for its benefit is limited.

=== Inferior vena cava filters ===
Inferior vena cava filters (IVCFs) are not recommended in those who are on anticoagulants. IVCFs may be used in clinical situations where a person has a high risk of experiencing a pulmonary embolism, but cannot be on anticoagulants due to a high risk of bleeding, or they have active bleeding. Retrievable IVCFs are recommended if IVCFs must be used, and a plan should be created to remove the filter when it is no longer needed.

=== Superficial venous thrombosis ===
While topical treatments for superficial venous thrombosis are widely used, the evidence is strongest for the heparin-like drug fondaparinux (a factor Xa inhibitor), which reduces extension and recurrence of superficial venous thrombosis as well as progression to symptomatic embolism.

== Prognosis ==
After an episode of unprovoked VTE, the risk of further episodes after completing treatment remains elevated, although this risk diminishes over time. Over ten years, 41% of men and 29% of women can expect to experience a further episode. For each episode, the risk of death is 4%.

== See also ==
- Portal vein thrombosis
- Arterial thrombosis
