= CHA2DS2–VASc score =

Estimation of stroke risk in some patients

CHA_{2}DS_{2}–VASc score
- Purpose: risk of stroke (for non-rheumatic atrial fibrillation)

The CHADS_{2} score and its proposed updated version, the CHA_{2}DS_{2}-VASc score, are clinical prediction rules for estimating the risk of stroke in people with non-rheumatic atrial fibrillation (AF), a common and serious heart arrhythmia associated with thromboembolic stroke. Such a score is used to determine whether or not treatment is required with anticoagulation therapy or antiplatelet therapy, since AF can cause stasis of blood in the upper heart chambers, leading to the formation of a mural thrombus that can dislodge into the blood flow, reach the brain, cut off supply to the brain, and cause a stroke.

A high score corresponds to a greater risk of stroke, while a low score corresponds to a lower risk of stroke. The CHADS_{2} score is simple and has been validated by many studies. In clinical use, the CHADS_{2} score (pronounced "chads two") has been superseded by the CHA_{2}DS_{2}-VASc score ("chads vasc"), which gives a better stratification of low-risk patients.

== Use ==
The CHA_{2}DS_{2}-VASc score is a widely used medical tool used to guide physicians on blood thinning treatment to prevent stroke in people with non-valvular atrial fibrillation (AF).

== CHADS_{2} ==
The CHADS_{2} score does not include some common stroke risk factors, and its various pros/cons have been carefully discussed. Adding together the points that correspond to the conditions that are present results in the CHADS_{2} score, that is used to estimate stroke risk.

CHADS_{2}
	Condition	Points
C	Congestive heart failure	1
H	Hypertension: blood pressure consistently above 140/90 mmHg (or treated hypertension on medication)	1
A	Age ≥75 years	1
D	Diabetes mellitus	1
S_{2}	Prior Stroke or TIA or Thromboembolism	2

Annual stroke risk (%)
CHADS_{2} Score	Risk	95% CI
0	1.9	1.2–3.0
1	2.8	2.0–3.8
2	4.0	3.1–5.1
3	5.9	4.6–7.3
4	8.5	6.3–11.1
5	12.5	8.2–17.5
6	18.2	10.5–27.4

== CHA_{2}DS_{2}-VASc ==
To complement the CHADS_{2} score, by the inclusion of additional 'stroke risk modifier' risk factors, the CHA_{2}DS_{2}-VASc-score has been proposed.

In clinical use, the CHADS_{2} score has been superseded by the CHA_{2}DS_{2}-VASc score, which gives a better stratification of low-risk patients. The CHADS_{2} score has been outperformed by the CHA_{2}DS_{2}-VASc in multiple patient groups including patients with AF who are receiving outpatient elective electrical cardioversion.

CHA_{2}DS_{2}-VASc
	Condition	Points
C	Congestive heart failure (or Left ventricular systolic dysfunction)	1
H	Hypertension: blood pressure consistently above 140/90 mmHg (or treated hypertension on medication)	1
A_{2}	Age ≥75 years	2
D	Diabetes Mellitus	1
S_{2}	Prior Stroke or TIA or thromboembolism	2
V	Vascular disease (e.g. peripheral artery disease, myocardial infarction, aortic plaque)	1
A	Age 65–74 years	1
Sc	Sex category (i.e. female sex)	1

Thus, the CHA_{2}DS_{2}-VASc score is a refinement of CHADS_{2} score and extends the latter by including additional common stroke risk factors, that is, age 65–74, female gender and vascular disease. In the CHA_{2}DS_{2}-VASc score, 'age 75 and above' also has extra weight, with 2 points.

The maximum CHADS_{2} score is 6, whilst the maximum CHA_{2}DS_{2}-VASc score is 9 (not 10, as might be expected from simply adding up the columns; the maximum score for age is 2 points).

Annual stroke risk (%)
CHA_{2}DS_{2}-VASc score	Friberg 2012(182,678 patients)	Lip 2010(1,084 patients)	95% CI
0	0.2	0.0	0.0–0.0
1	0.6	0.6	0.0–3.4
2	2.2	1.6	0.3–4.7
3	3.2	3.9	1.7–7.6
4	4.8	1.9	0.5–4.9
5	7.2	3.2	0.7–9.0
6	9.7	3.6	0.4–12.3
7	11.2	8.0	1.0–26.0
8	10.8	11.1	0.3–48.3
9	12.2	100 (based on single patient)	2.5–100

Major guidelines have used the above fixed annual stroke risk as a guideline of starting anticoagulant treatment; where the ischemic stroke risk of more than 1% to 2% should be an indication to start an anticoagulant therapy. However, actual risk of getting stroke varies according to sampling method and geographical regions, as well as use of appropriate study analysis methodology. A meta-analysis of various studies in 2015 shown that annual stroke risk is less than 1% in 13 of the 17 studies for CHA_{2}DS_{2}-VASc score of 1, 6 out of 15 studies reported risk of 1 to 2% and 5 out of 15 studies reported risk of more than 2% for CHA_{2}DS_{2}-VASc score of 2. Nevertheless, stroke rates vary by study setting (hospital vs community), population (trial vs general), ethnicity, etc. Some studies included in the metaanalysis include females with score 1 by virtue of gender (who are low risk), into the aggregate rates; others included do not account for followup anticoagulation use (thus lowering rates) and were analysed by excluding all patients ever started on anticoagulants ('conditioning on the future' error).

The CHA_{2}DS_{2}-VASc Score has shown increasing popularity over time while the CHADS_{2} has shown decreasing popularity, which could "partly be related to introduction of guidelines recommending the use of the CHA_{2}DS_{2}-VASc score for stroke risk stratification". The predictive abilities of risk scores for ischemic stroke in patients with kidney function impairment is questionable: a large head-to-head external validation study demonstrated poor discrimination and calibration in patients with reduced kidney function.

== CHA_{2}DS_{2}-VA ==
In 2024, the CHA_{2}DS_{2}-VA score was proposed in the latest ESC guidelines to simplify the CHA_{2}DS_{2}-VASc score by removing the sex category, albeit with Level of Evidence C (ie.consensus). This modification was introduced in response to discussions about the role of female sex as an age-dependent stroke risk modifier rather than an independent stroke risk factor per se. The 2024 ESC guidelines justifies the use of the non-sex CHA2DS2-VASc (i.e. CHA2DS2-VA) because '... the inclusion of gender complicates clinical practice both for healthcare professionals and patients' and '... it also omits individuals who identify as non-binary, transgender, or are undergoing sex hormone therapy.

== Treatment recommendations ==
The CHA_{2}DS_{2}-VASc score has been used in the 2012 and subsequent European Society of Cardiology guidelines for the management of atrial fibrillation. The 2014 American College of Cardiology/American Heart Association Task Force on Practice Guidelines and the Heart Rhythm Society guidelines also recommend use of the CHA_{2}DS_{2}-VASc score.

The European Society of Cardiology (ESC), and National Institute for Health and Care Excellence (NICE) guidelines recommend that if the patient has a CHA_{2}DS_{2}-VASc score of 2 and above, oral anticoagulation therapy (OAC) with a vitamin K antagonist (VKA, e.g. warfarin with target INR of 2–3) or one of the direct oral anticoagulant drugs (DOACs, e.g. dabigatran, rivaroxaban, edoxaban, or apixaban) is recommended.

If the patient is 'low risk' using the CHA_{2}DS_{2}-VASc score (that is, 0 in males or 1 in females), no anticoagulant therapy is recommended.

In males with 1 stroke risk factor (that is, a CHA_{2}DS_{2}-VASc score=1), antithrombotic therapy with OAC may be considered, and people's values and preferences should be considered. Even a single stroke risk factor confers excess risk of stroke and mortality, with a positive net clinical benefit for stroke prevention with oral anticoagulation, when compared to no treatment or aspirin. As mentioned above, thromboembolic event rates differ according to various guideline treatment thresholds and methodological approaches.

=== Anticoagulation ===
Treatment recommendations based on the CHA_{2}DS_{2}-VASc score are shown in the following table:

Score	Risk	Anticoagulation Therapy	Considerations
0 (male) or 1 (female)	Low	No anticoagulant therapy	No anticoagulant therapy
1 (male)	Moderate	Oral anticoagulant should be considered	Oral anticoagulant, with well controlled vitamin K antagonist (VKA, e.g. warfarin with time in therapeutic range >70%), or a direct oral anticoagulant (DOAC, e.g. dabigatran, rivaroxaban, edoxaban or apixaban)
2 or greater	High	Oral anticoagulant is recommended	Oral anticoagulant, with well controlled vitamin K antagonist (VKA, e.g. warfarin with time in therapeutic range >70%), or a direct oral anticoagulant (DOAC, e.g. dabigatran, rivaroxaban, edoxaban or apixaban)

Based on the ESC guidelines on AF, oral anticoagulation is recommended or preferred for people with one or more stroke risk factors (i.e. a CHA_{2}DS_{2}-VASc score of ≥1 in males, or ≥2 in females). This is consistent with a recent decision analysis model showing how the 'tipping point' on the decision to anticoagulate has changed with the availability of the 'safer' DOAC drugs, where the threshold for offering stroke prevention (i.e. oral anticoagulation) is a stroke rate of approximately 1%/year.

Those patients recommended for stroke prevention treatment via oral anticoagulation, choice of drug (i.e. between a vitamin K antagonist and direct oral anticoagulant (DOAC)) can be evaluated using the SAMe-TT2R2 score to help decision-making on the most appropriate oral anticoagulant.

=== Bleeding risk ===
Stroke risk assessment should always include an assessment of bleeding risk. This can be done using validated bleeding risk scores, such as the HEMORR_{2}HAGES or HAS-BLED scores. The HAS-BLED score is recommended in guidelines, to identify the high risk patient for regular review and followup and to address the reversible risk factors for bleeding (e.g. uncontrolled hypertension, labile INRS, excess alcohol use or concomitant aspirin/NSAID use). If the patient is taking warfarin, then knowledge of INR control is needed to assess the 'labile INR' criterion in HAS-BLED; otherwise for a non-warfarin patient, this criterion scores zero. A high HAS-BLED score is not a reason to withhold anticoagulation. Also, when compared to HAS-BLED, other bleeding risk scores that did not consider 'labile INR' would significantly underperform in predicting bleeding on warfarin, and would often inappropriately categorise many patients who sustained bleeds as 'low risk'.

== History ==
The CHA_{2}DS_{2}-VASc score expanded from the CHADS2 score, first published in 2001.
