= Spinal epidural hematoma =

- Specialty: Neurology

Spinal extradural haematoma or spinal epidural hematoma (SEH) is bleeding into the epidural space in the spine. These may arise spontaneously (e.g. during childbirth), or as a rare complication of epidural anaesthesia or of surgery (such as laminectomy). Symptoms usually include back pain which radiates to the arms or the legs. They may cause pressure on the spinal cord or cauda equina, which may present as pain, muscle weakness, or dysfunction of the bladder and bowel.

== Pathophysiology ==
The anatomy of the epidural space is such that spinal epidural hematoma has a different presentation from intracranial epidural hematoma. In the spine, the epidural space contains loose fatty tissue and a network of large, thin-walled veins, referred to as the epidural venous plexus. The source of bleeding in spinal epidural hematoma is likely to be this venous plexus.

== Diagnosis ==
The best way to confirm the diagnosis is MRI. Risk factors include anatomical abnormalities and bleeding disorders.

== Treatment ==
Treatment is generally with emergency surgery. The risk following epidural anaesthesia is difficult to quantify; estimates vary from 1 per 10,000 to 1 per 100,000 epidural anaesthetics.
