= Apixaban =

Anticoagulant medication sold as Eliquis

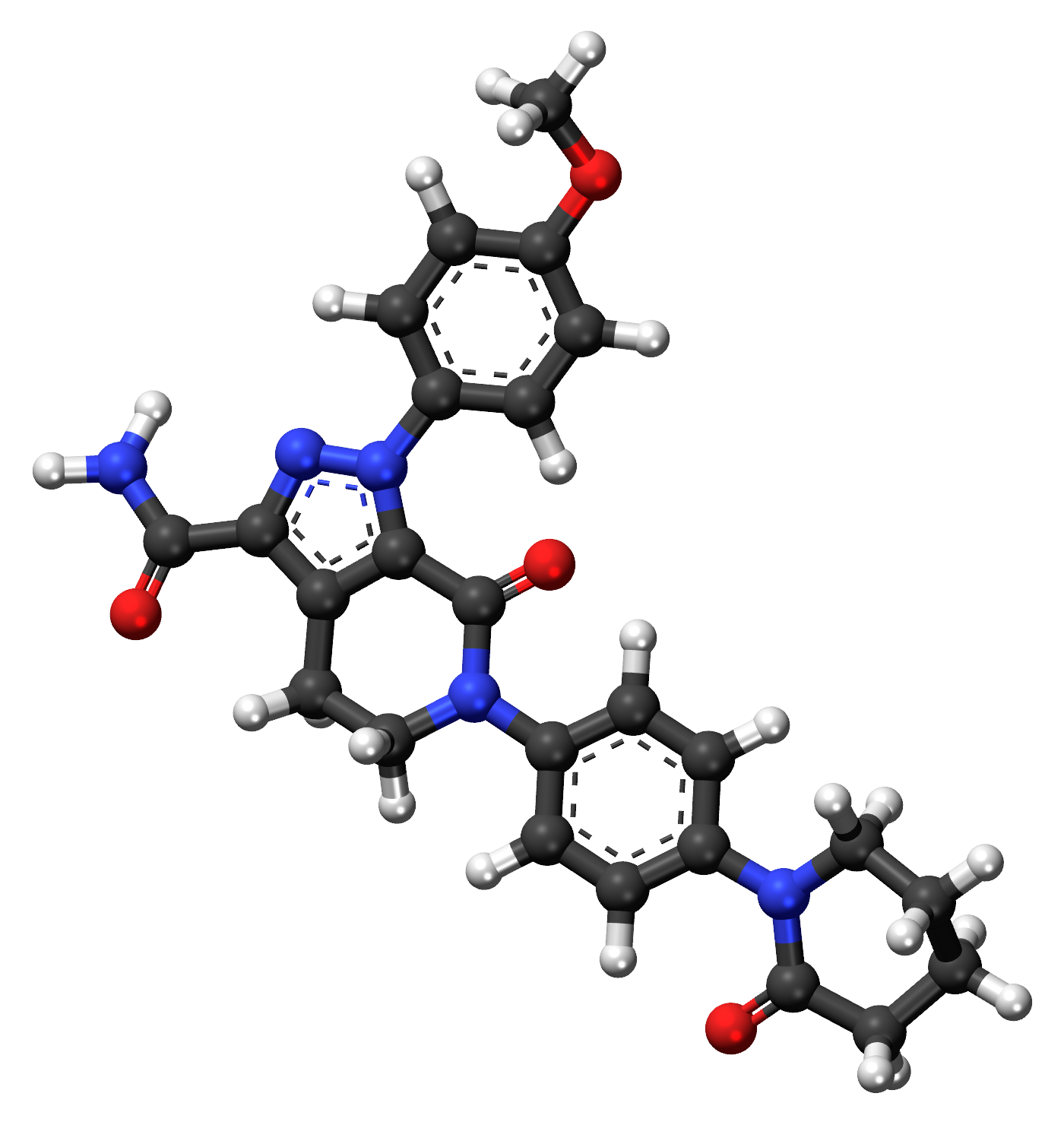

Clinical data
- Trade names: Eliquis, others
- Other names: BMS-562247-01
- AHFS/Drugs.com: Monograph
- MedlinePlus: a613032
- License data: US DailyMed: Apixaban
- Pregnancy category: AU: C
- Routes of administration: By mouth
- ATC code: B01AF02 (WHO)

Legal status
- Legal status: AU: S4 (Prescription only); CA: ℞-only; UK: POM (Prescription only); US: ℞-only; EU: Rx-only; In general: ℞ (Prescription only)

Pharmacokinetic data
- Bioavailability: ~50%
- Protein binding: ~87%
- Metabolism: CYP3A4, CYP3A5, CYP1A2 and others
- Elimination half-life: 9–14 h
- Excretion: Bile duct (75%), kidney (25%)

Identifiers
- IUPAC name: 1-(4-methoxyphenyl)-7-oxo-6-[4-(2-oxopiperidin-1-yl)phenyl]-4,5,6,7-tetrahydro-1H-pyrazolo[3,4-c]pyridine-3-carboxamide
- CAS Number: 503612-47-3
- PubChem CID: 10182969
- IUPHAR/BPS: 6390
- DrugBank: DB07828
- ChemSpider: 8358471
- UNII: 3Z9Y7UWC1J
- KEGG: D03213
- ChEMBL: ChEMBL231779
- CompTox Dashboard (EPA): DTXSID80436500
- ECHA InfoCard: 100.167.332

Chemical and physical data
- Formula: C_{25}H_{25}N_{5}O_{4}
- Molar mass: 459.506 g·mol^{−1}
- 3D model (JSmol): Interactive image
- SMILES: O=C5N(c4ccc(N3C(=O)c1c(c(nn1c2ccc(OC)cc2)C(=O)N)CC3)cc4)CCCC5
- InChI: InChI=1S/C25H25N5O4/c1-34-19-11-9-18(10-12-19)30-23-20(22(27-30)24(26)32)13-15-29(25(23)33)17-7-5-16(6-8-17)28-14-3-2-4-21(28)31/h5-12H,2-4,13-15H2,1H3,(H2,26,32); Key:QNZCBYKSOIHPEH-UHFFFAOYSA-N

Apixaban, sold under the brand name Eliquis among others, is an anticoagulant medication used to treat and prevent blood clots and to prevent stroke in people with nonvalvular atrial fibrillation through directly inhibiting factor Xa. It is used as an alternative to warfarin to prevent blood clots following hip or knee replacement and in those with a history of prior clots and does not require monitoring by blood tests or dietary restrictions. It is taken by mouth.

Common side effects include bleeding and nausea. Other side effects may include bleeding around the spine and allergic reactions. Use is not recommended during pregnancy or breastfeeding. Use appears to be relatively safe in those with mild kidney problems. Compared to warfarin it has fewer interactions with other medications. It is a direct factor Xa inhibitor.

In 2007, Pfizer and Bristol-Myers Squibb began the development of apixaban as an anticoagulant. Apixaban was approved for medical use in the European Union in May 2011, and in the United States in December 2012. It is on the World Health Organization's List of Essential Medicines. In 2024, it was the 25th most commonly prescribed medication in the United States, with more than 21 million prescriptions. It is available as a generic medication, although not in the United States.

== Medical uses ==
Apixaban is indicated for the following:

- To lower the risk of stroke and systemic embolism in people with atrial fibrillation who have risk factors that may lead to a stroke.
- The prevention of deep vein thrombosis (DVT) in patients who have undergone knee or hip replacement surgery.
- Treatment of both DVT and pulmonary embolism (PE).
- For extended treatment to reduce risk of recurring venous thrombosis events (VTE) after initial therapy in patients with high risk of recurrence, such as patients with active cancer or those with unprovoked VTE.

In the EU, apixaban is indicated for the prevention of venous thromboembolic events (VTE) in adults who have undergone elective hip or knee replacement surgery, the prevention of stroke and systemic embolism in adults with non-valvular atrial fibrillation (NVAF) with one or more risk factors, for the treatment of deep vein thrombosis and pulmonary embolism in adults, and for the prevention of recurrent DVT and PE in adults.

=== Atrial fibrillation ===
Apixaban is recommended by the National Institute for Health and Clinical Excellence for the prevention of stroke and systemic embolism in people with atrial fibrillation and a CHA2DS2-VASc score ≥ 2. Apixaban may also be considered for men with a CHA2DS2-VASc of 1 after accounting for bleeding risk.

Apixaban and other direct oral anticoagulants (DOACs) (dabigatran, edoxaban and rivaroxaban) are at least as effective as warfarin in preventing stroke or systemic embolism in people with atrial fibrillation not caused by moderate-to-severe mitral stenosis or mechanical heart valves. Compared to warfarin, DOACs are associated with a significantly lower risk of intracranial hemorrhage, with apixaban demonstrating both superior efficacy and safety.

While data are limited for the use of apixaban in people with severely decreased kidney function and those on hemodialysis, studies are investigating its potential as an alternative to standard therapy, vitamin K antagonists. However, optimal dosing in these populations is yet to be determined.

== Side effects ==
=== Bleeding ===
Bleeding is a known side effect of apixaban. The likelihood of bleeding increases when it is combined with other medications that affect blood clotting, such as anticoagulants, aspirin, antiplatelet medications, selective serotonin reuptake inhibitors (SSRIs), serotonin-norepinephrine reuptake inhibitors (SNRIs), and nonsteroidal anti-inflammatory drugs (NSAIDs). Large clinical trials, including the ARISTOTLE trial, have shown that these combinations can modestly raise the risk of major bleeding. In clinical practice, healthcare providers carefully assess each patient's individual risk to ensure apixaban is used safely and effectively. In some cases, patients may also report fatigue or tiredness, which can occur as a secondary effect related to anemia or blood loss rather than a direct pharmacological action of apixaban.

Andexanet alfa is a US Food and Drug Administration (FDA) approved antidote for apixaban in people with uncontrolled and life-threatening bleeding events.

Andexanet alfa was voluntarily withdrawn from the U.S. market effective 22 December 2025.

=== Spinal puncture ===
Following spinal anesthesia or puncture, people who are being treated with anti-thrombotic agents are at higher risk for developing a hematoma, which causes long-term or permanent paralysis. The risk of this may be increased by using epidural or intrathecal catheters after a surgical operation or from the concurrent use of medicinal agents that affect hemostasis.

== Mechanism of action ==
Apixaban is a highly selective, orally bioavailable, and reversible direct inhibitor of free and clot-bound factor Xa. Factor Xa catalyzes the conversion of prothrombin to thrombin, the final enzyme in the coagulation cascade that is responsible for fibrin clot formation. Apixaban has no direct effect on platelet aggregation, but by inhibiting factor Xa, it indirectly decreases clot formation induced by thrombin.

== History ==
Apixaban was approved for medical use in the European Union in May 2011.

A new drug application (NDA) for the approval of apixaban was submitted to the US Food and Drug Administration (FDA) by Bristol-Myers Squibb (BMS) and Pfizer jointly after the conclusion of the ARISTOTLE clinical trial in 2011. Apixaban was approved for the prevention of stroke in people with atrial fibrillation in December 2012. In March 2014, it was approved for the additional indication of preventing deep vein thrombosis and pulmonary embolism in people who have recently undergone knee or hip replacement. In August 2014, the FDA approved apixaban for the additional indication of the treatment of recurring deep vein thrombosis and pulmonary embolism. During its development the drug was known as BMS-562247-01. In 2019, sales of the product by BMS accounted for thirty percent of their quarterly revenue.

== Society and culture ==
=== Economics ===
In December 2019, the US Food and Drug Administration approved a generic version of apixaban produced jointly by Mylan and Micro Labs. BMS and Pfizer worked quickly to block generics from being created, and in August 2020, they won a patent infringement lawsuit against Sigmapharm, Sunshine Lake, and Unichem, after previously settling patent cases against 25 other companies. In September 2021, a Federal Circuit Court upheld the ruling. The result is that apixaban generics will most likely not be available in the United States until at least 2026, but possibly 2031.

In July 2022, the Canadian generic drug company, Apotex Inc., obtained approval for marketing of apixaban.

Pfizer reported revenue of US$6.747 billion for Eliquis in 2023.

Apixaban is one of ten medications covered by price negotiations in the US under the Inflation Reduction Act. The negotiations, conducted by the Centers for Medicare & Medicaid Services, apply to pricing for Medicare recipients. The results of the negotiations were announced in August 2024, and Medicare's negotiated price for a 30-day supply of Eliquis is $231, a 56% decrease from the 2023 list price of $521. The pricing is set to take effect in 2026.
