= Anticoagulant =

Class of drugs

- Drug class
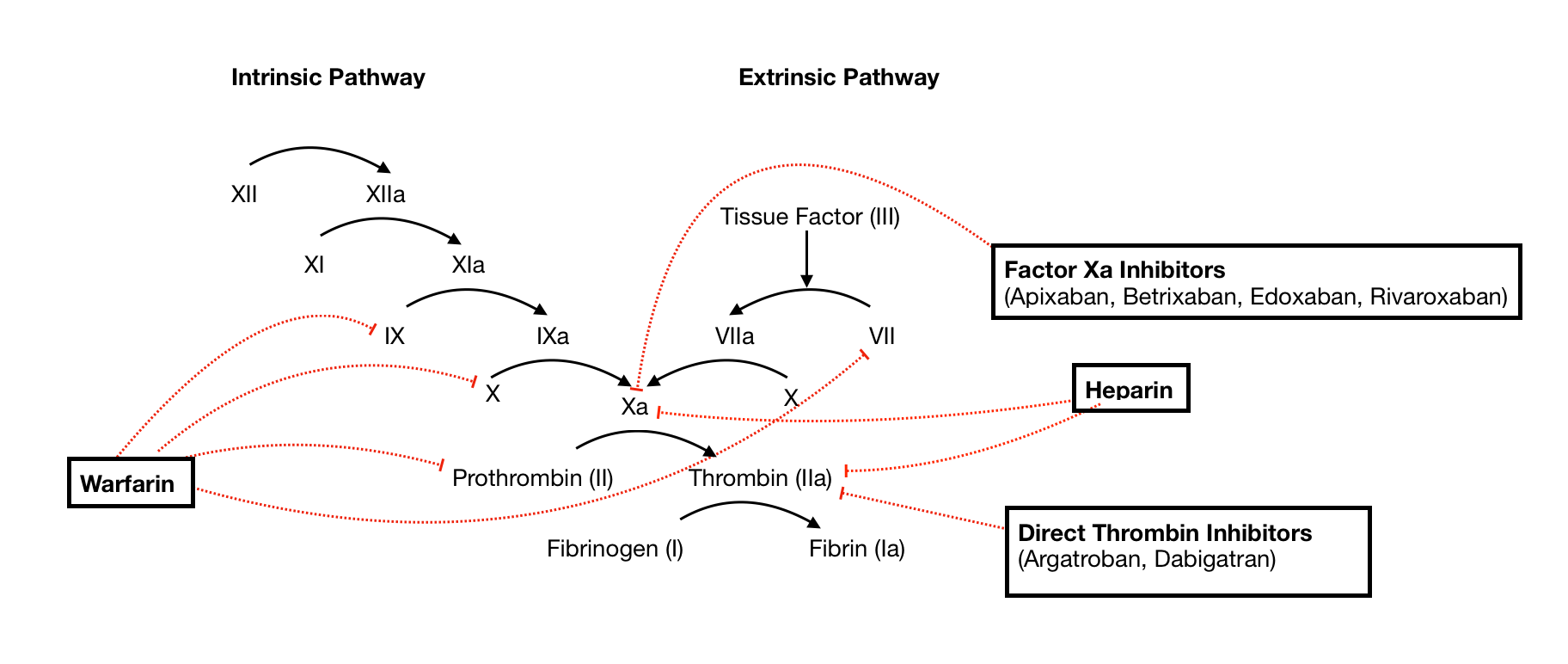
- Coagulation cascade and major classes of anticoagulants

Class identifiers
- ATC code: B01

External links
- MeSH: D00534-class

Legal status

An anticoagulant, commonly known as a blood thinner, is a chemical substance that prevents or reduces the coagulation of blood, prolonging the clotting time. Some occur naturally in blood-eating animals, such as leeches and mosquitoes, which help keep the bite area unclotted long enough for the animal to obtain blood.

As a class of medications, anticoagulants are used in therapy for thrombotic disorders. Oral anticoagulants (OACs) are taken by many people in pill or tablet form, and various intravenous anticoagulant dosage forms are used in hospitals. Some anticoagulants are used in medical equipment, such as sample tubes, blood transfusion bags, heart–lung machines, and dialysis equipment. One of the first anticoagulants, warfarin, was initially approved as a rodenticide.

Anticoagulants are closely related to antiplatelet drugs and thrombolytic drugs by manipulating the various pathways of blood coagulation. Specifically, antiplatelet drugs inhibit platelet aggregation (clumping together), whereas anticoagulants inhibit specific pathways of the coagulation cascade, which happens after the initial platelet aggregation but before the formation of fibrin and stable aggregated platelet products.

Common anticoagulants include warfarin and heparin.

== Medical uses ==
The use of anticoagulants is a decision based on the risks and benefits of anticoagulation. The biggest risk of anticoagulation therapy is the increased risk of bleeding. In otherwise healthy people, the increased risk of bleeding is minimal, but those who have had recent surgery, cerebral aneurysms, and other conditions may have too great a risk of bleeding. Generally, the benefit of anticoagulation is preventing or reducing the progression of a thromboembolic disease. Some indications for anticoagulant therapy that are known to have benefit from therapy include:

- Atrial fibrillation – commonly forms an atrial appendage clot
- Coronary artery disease
- Deep vein thrombosis – can lead to pulmonary embolism
- Ischemic stroke
- Hypercoagulable states (e.g., Factor V Leiden) – can lead to deep vein thrombosis
- Mechanical heart valves
- Myocardial infarction
- Pulmonary embolism
- Restenosis from stents
- Cardiopulmonary bypass (or any other surgeries requiring temporary aortic occlusion)
- Heart failure

In these cases, anticoagulation therapy prevents the formation or growth of dangerous clots.

The decision to begin therapeutic anticoagulation often involves the use of multiple bleeding risk predictable outcome tools as non-invasive pre-test stratifications due to the potential for bleeding while on blood thinning agents. Among these tools are HAS-BLED, ATRIA, HEMORR2HAGES, and CHA2DS2-VASc. The risk of bleeding using the risk assessment tools above must then be weighed against thrombotic risk to formally determine the patient's overall benefit in starting anticoagulation therapy.

There is no evidence to indicate that adding anticoagulant therapy to standard treatment has a benefit for people with cerebral small vessel disease but not dementia, and there is an increased risk of a person with this disease experiencing a bleed with this approach.

== Adverse effects ==
The most serious and common adverse side effects associated with anticoagulants are increased risk of bleeding, both nonmajor and major bleeding events. The bleeding risk depends on the class of anticoagulant agent used, the patient's age, and pre-existing health conditions. Warfarin has an estimated incidence of bleeding of 15–20% per year and a life-threatening bleeding rate of 1–3% per year. Newer non-vitamin K antagonist oral anticoagulants appear to have fewer life-threatening bleeding events than warfarin. Additionally, patients aged 80 years or more may be especially susceptible to bleeding complications, with a rate of 13 bleeds per 100 person-years. Bleeding risk is especially important to consider in patients with renal impairment and NOAC therapy because all NOACs, to some extent, are excreted by the kidneys. Thus, patients with renal impairment may be at higher risk of increased bleeding.

In people with cancer, a systematic review has found warfarin had no effect on death rate or the risk of blood clots. However, it did increase the risk of major bleeding in 107 more people per 1000 population and minor bleeding in 167 more people per 1000 population. Apixaban had no effect on mortality, recurrence of blood clots in blood vessels, or major or minor bleeding. However, this finding comes only from one study.

Nonhemorrhagic adverse events are less common than hemorrhagic adverse events but should still be monitored closely. Nonhemorrhagic adverse events of warfarin include skin necrosis, limb gangrene, and purple toe syndrome. Skin necrosis and limb gangrene are most commonly observed on the third to eighth day of therapy. The exact pathogenesis of skin necrosis and limb gangrene is not completely understood but it is believed to be associated with warfarin's effect on inhibiting the production of protein C and protein S. Purple toe syndrome typically develops three to eight weeks after initiation of warfarin therapy. Other adverse effects of warfarin are associated with depletion of vitamin K, which can lead to inhibition of G1a proteins and growth arrest-specific gene 6, which can lead to increased risk of arterial calcification and heart valve, especially if too much Vitamin D is present. Warfarin's interference with G1a proteins has also been linked to abnormalities in fetal bone development in mothers who were treated with warfarin during pregnancy. Long-term warfarin and heparin usage have also been linked to osteoporosis.

Another potentially severe complication associated with heparin use is called heparin-induced thrombocytopenia (HIT). There are two distinct types: HIT 1) immune-mediated and 2) non-immune-mediated. Immune-mediated HIT most commonly arises five to ten days after exposure to heparin. Pathogenesis of immune-mediated HIT is believed to be caused by heparin-dependent immunoglobulin antibodies binding to platelet factor 4/heparin complexes on platelets, leading to widespread platelet activation.

== Interactions ==
Foods and food supplements with blood-thinning effects include nattokinase, lumbrokinase, beer, bilberry, celery, cranberries, fish oil, garlic, ginger, ginkgo, ginseng, green tea, horse chestnut, licorice, niacin, onion, papaya, pomegranate, red clover, soybean, St. John's wort, turmeric, wheatgrass, and willow bark. Many herbal supplements have blood-thinning properties, such as danshen and feverfew. Multivitamins that do not interact with clotting are available for patients on anticoagulants.

However, some foods and supplements encourage clotting. These include alfalfa, avocado, cat's claw, coenzyme Q10, and dark leafy greens such as spinach. Excessive intake of the food mentioned above should be avoided while taking anticoagulants, or if coagulability is being monitored, their intake should be kept approximately constant so that anticoagulant dosage can be maintained at a level high enough to counteract this effect without fluctuations in coagulability.

Grapefruit interferes with some anticoagulant drugs, increasing the time it takes for them to be metabolized out of the body, and should be eaten with caution when on anticoagulant drugs.

Anticoagulants are often used to treat acute deep-vein thrombosis. People using anticoagulants to treat this condition should avoid using bed rest as a complementary treatment because there are clinical benefits to continuing to walk and remaining mobile while using anticoagulants in this way. Bed rest while using anticoagulants can harm patients in circumstances in which it is not medically necessary.

== Types ==
Several anticoagulants are available. Warfarin, other coumarins, and heparins have long been used. Since the 2000s, several agents have been introduced that are collectively referred to as direct oral anticoagulants (DOACs).

=== Coumarins (vitamin K antagonists) ===
These oral anticoagulants are derived from coumarin found in many plants. A prominent member of this class, warfarin (Coumadin), was found to be the anticoagulant most prescribed in a large multispecialty practice. The anticoagulant effect takes at least 48 to 72 hours to develop. Where an immediate effect is required, heparin is given concomitantly. These anticoagulants are used to treat patients with deep-vein thrombosis (DVT) and pulmonary embolism (PE) and to prevent emboli in patients with atrial fibrillation (AF), and mechanical prosthetic heart valves. Other examples are acenocoumarol, phenprocoumon, atromentin, and phenindione.

The coumarins brodifacoum and difenacoum are used as mammalicides (particularly as rodenticides) but are not used medically.

=== Heparin and derivative substances ===
Heparin is the most widely used intravenous clinical anticoagulant worldwide. Heparin is a naturally occurring glycosaminoglycan. There are three major categories of heparin: unfractionated heparin (UFH), low molecular weight heparin (LMWH), and ultra-low-molecular weight heparin (ULMWH). Unfractionated heparin is usually derived from pig intestines and bovine lungs. UFH binds to the enzyme inhibitor antithrombin III (AT), causing a conformational change that results in its activation. The activated AT then inactivates factor Xa, thrombin, and other coagulation factors. Heparin can be used in vivo (by injection), and also in vitro to prevent blood or plasma clotting in or on medical devices. In venipuncture, Vacutainer brand blood collecting tubes containing heparin usually have a green cap.

==== Low molecular weight heparin (LMWH) ====
Low molecular weight heparin (LMWH) is produced through a controlled depolymerization of unfractionated heparin. LMWH exhibits a higher anti-Xa/anti-IIa activity ratio and is useful as it does not require monitoring of the APTT coagulation parameter and has fewer side effects.

=== Synthetic pentasaccharide inhibitors of factor Xa ===
- Fondaparinux is a synthetic sugar composed of the five sugars (pentasaccharides) in heparin that bind to antithrombin. It is a smaller molecule than low molecular-weight heparin.
- Idraparinux
- Idrabiotaparinux

=== Direct oral ===
The direct oral anticoagulants (DOACs) were introduced in and after 2008. DOACs were previously called novel oral anticoagulants (NOACs), non-vitamin K antagonist oral anticoagulants, or target-specific oral anticoagulants (TSOACs). These agents include direct thrombin inhibitors, such as dabigatran, and direct factor Xa inhibitors including rivaroxaban, apixaban, betrixaban and edoxaban. DOACs have been shown to be as good or possibly better than the coumarins with less serious side effects. The newer anticoagulants (NOACs/DOACs) are more expensive than the traditional ones and should be used in caring for patients with kidney problems.

Compared to warfarin, DOACs have a rapid onset action and relatively short half-lives; hence, they carry out their function more rapidly and effectively, allowing drugs to reduce their anticoagulation effects quickly. Routine monitoring and dose adjustments of DOACs are less important than for warfarin, as they have better predictable anticoagulation activity. DOAC monitoring, including laboratory monitoring and a complete medication review, should generally be conducted before initiation of a DOAC, 1–3 months after initiation, and then every 6–12 months afterwards.

Both DOACs and warfarin are equivalently effective, but compared to warfarin, DOACs have fewer drug interactions, no known dietary interactions, a wider therapeutic index, and have conventional dosing that does not require dose adjustments with constant monitoring. However, there is no countermeasure for most DOACs, unlike for warfarin; nonetheless, the short half-lives of DOACs will allow their effects to recede swiftly. A reversal agent for dabigatran, idarucizumab, is currently available and approved for use by the FDA. Rates of adherence to DOACs are only modestly higher than adherence to warfarin among patients prescribed these drugs. Thus, adherence to anticoagulation is often poor despite hopes that DOACs would lead to higher adherence rates.

DOACs are significantly more expensive than warfarin, but the patients on DOACs may have reduced lab costs as they do not need to monitor their INR.

==== Direct factor Xa inhibitors ====
Drugs such as rivaroxaban, apixaban and edoxaban work by inhibiting factor Xa directly (unlike heparins and fondaparinux, which work via antithrombin activation). Also included in this category are betrixaban from Portola Pharmaceuticals, the discontinued darexaban (YM150) from Astellas, and, more recently, the discontinued letaxaban (TAK-442) from Takeda and eribaxaban (PD0348292) from Pfizer. Betrixaban is significant as it was in 2018, the only oral factor Xa inhibitor approved by the FDA for use in acutely medically ill patients. Darexaban development was discontinued in September 2011; in a trial for prevention of recurrences of myocardial infarction in addition to dual antiplatelet therapy (DAPT), the drug did not demonstrate effectiveness, and the risk of bleeding was increased by approximately 300%. The development of letaxaban for acute coronary syndrome was discontinued in May 2011 following negative results from a Phase II study.

==== Direct thrombin inhibitors ====
Another type of anticoagulant is the direct thrombin inhibitor. Current members of this class include the bivalent drugs hirudin, lepirudin, and bivalirudin and the monovalent drugs argatroban and dabigatran. An oral direct thrombin inhibitor, ximelagatran (Exanta), was denied approval by the Food and Drug Administration (FDA) in September 2004 and was pulled from the market entirely in February 2006 after reports of severe liver damage and heart attacks. In November 2010, dabigatran etexilate was approved by the FDA to prevent thrombosis in atrial fibrillation.

==== Relevance to dental treatments ====
As in any invasive procedure, patients on anticoagulation therapy have an increased risk for bleeding, and caution should be used along with local hemostatic methods to minimize bleeding risk during the operation as well as postoperatively. However, with regards to DOACs and invasive dental treatments, there has not been enough clinical evidence and experience to prove any reliable adverse effects, relevance or interaction between these two. Further clinical prospective studies on DOACs are required to investigate the bleeding risk and hemostasis associated with surgical and dental procedures.

Recommendations of modifications to the usage/dosage of DOACs before dental treatments are made based on the balance of the bleeding risk of each procedure and also the individual's own bleeding risks and renal functionality. With low-bleeding-risk dental procedures, it is recommended that DOACs be continued by the patient to avoid any increase in the risk of a thromboembolic event. For dental procedures with a higher risk of bleeding complications (i.e. complex extractions, adjacent extractions leading to a large wound, or more than three extractions), the recommended practice is for the patient to miss or delay a dose of their DOAC before such procedures to minimize the effect on bleeding risk.

=== Antithrombin protein therapeutics ===
The antithrombin protein is used as a protein therapeutic that can be purified from human plasma or produced recombinantly (for example, Atryn, produced in the milk of genetically modified goats).

The FDA approves Antithrombin as an anticoagulant for preventing clots before, during, or after surgery or birthing in patients with hereditary antithrombin deficiency.

=== Other ===
Many other anticoagulants exist in research and development, diagnostics, or as drug candidates.

- Batroxobin, a toxin from snake venom, clots platelet-rich plasma without affecting platelet functions (cleaves fibrinogen).
- Hementin is an anticoagulant protease from the salivary glands of the giant Amazon leech, Haementeria ghilianii.
- Vitamin E
- Alcoholic beverage

== Reversal agents ==
With the growing number of patients taking oral anticoagulation therapy, studies into reversal agents are gaining increasing interest due to major bleeding events and the need for urgent anticoagulant reversal therapy. Reversal agents for warfarin are more widely studied, and established guidelines for reversal exist due to a longer history of use of warfarin and the ability to get a more accurate measurement of anticoagulation effect in a patient via measuring the INR (International Normalized Ratio). In general, vitamin K is most commonly used to reverse the effect of warfarin in non-urgent settings. However, in urgent settings or settings with extremely high INR (INR >20), hemostatic reversal agents such as fresh frozen plasma (FFP), recombinant factor VIIa, and prothrombin complex concentrate (PCC) have been utilized with proven efficacy. Specifically with warfarin, four-factor PCC (4F-PCC) has been shown to have superior safety and mortality benefits compared to FPP in lowering INR levels.

Although specific antidotes and reversal agents for DOACs are not as widely studied, idarucizumab (for dabigatran) and andexanet alfa (for factor Xa inhibitor) have been used in clinical settings with varying efficacy. Idarucizumab is a monoclonal antibody, approved by the US FDA in 2015, that reverses the effect of dabigatran by binding to both free and thrombin-bound dabigatran. Andexanet alfa is a recombinant modified human factor Xa decoy that reverses the effect of factor Xa inhibitors by binding at the active sites of factor Xa inhibitor and making it catalytically inactive. Andexanet alfa was approved by the US FDA in 2018. Another drug called ciraparantag, a potential reversal agent for direct factor Xa inhibitors, is still under investigation. Additionally, hemostatic reversal agents have also been used with varying efficacy to reverse the effects of DOACs.

== Coagulation inhibitor measurement ==
A Bethesda unit (BU) is a measure of blood coagulation inhibitor activity. It is the amount of inhibitor that will inactivate half of a coagulant during the incubation period. It is the standard measure used in the United States and is so named because it was adopted as a standard at a conference in Bethesda, Maryland.

== Laboratory use ==
If blood is allowed to clot, laboratory instruments, blood transfusion bags, and medical and surgical equipment will become clogged and non-operational. In addition, test tubes used for laboratory blood tests will have chemicals added to stop blood clotting. Besides heparin, most of these chemicals bind calcium ions, preventing the coagulation proteins from using them.

- Ethylenediaminetetraacetic acid (EDTA) strongly and irreversibly chelates (binds) calcium ions, preventing blood from clotting.
- Citrate is in liquid form in the tube and is used for coagulation tests and blood transfusion bags. It binds calcium but not as strongly as EDTA. The correct proportion of this anticoagulant to blood is crucial because of the dilution, which can be reversed with the addition of calcium. Formulations include plain sodium citrate, acid-citrate-dextrose, and more.
- Oxalate has a mechanism similar to that of citrate. It is the anticoagulant used in fluoride/oxalate tubes to determine glucose and lactate levels. The fluoride inhibits glycolysis, which can throw off blood sugar measurements. Citrate/fluoride/EDTA tubes work better in this regard.

== Dental considerations for long-term users ==
Dental practitioners play an important role in the early detection of anticoagulant overdose through oral manifestations, as the patient does not show any symptoms. Dental treatment of patients taking anticoagulant or antiplatelet medication raises safety concerns in terms of the potential risk of bleeding complications following invasive dental procedures. Therefore, certain guidelines for the dental care of patients taking these drugs are needed.

Detecting overdose

An overdose of anticoagulants usually occurs in people who have heart problems and need to take anticoagulants in the long term to reduce the risk of stroke from their high blood pressure.

An International Normalised Ratio (INR) test would be recommended to confirm the overdose so that the dosage can be adjusted to an acceptable standard. The INR test measures the time it takes for a clot to form in a blood sample relative to a standard.

An INR value of 1 indicates a level of coagulation equivalent to that of an average patient not taking warfarin, and values greater than 1 indicate a longer clotting time and, thus, a longer bleeding time.

Assessing bleeding risk

There are two main parts to the assessment of bleeding risk:

- Assessment of the likely risk of bleeding associated with the required dental procedure
- Assessment of the patient's individual-level bleeding risk

Managing bleeding risk

A patient who is on anticoagulants or antiplatelet medications may undergo dental treatments which are unlikely to cause bleeding, such as local anesthesia injection, basic gum charting, removal of plaque, calculus and stain above the gum level, direct or indirect fillings which are above the gingiva, root canal treatment, taking impression for denture or crown and fitting or adjustment of orthodontic appliances. For all these procedures, it is recommended that the dentist treat the patient following the normal standard procedure and taking care to avoid any bleeding.

For a patient who needs to undergo dental treatments which are more likely to cause bleeding, such as simple tooth extractions (1-3 teeth with small wound size), drainage of swelling inside the mouth, periodontal charting, root planing, direct or indirect filling which extends below the gingiva, complex filling, flap raising procedure, gingival recontouring and biopsies, the dentist needs to take extra precautions apart from the standard procedure. The recommendations are as follows:

- if the patient has another medical condition or is taking other medication that may increase bleeding risk, consult the patient's general medical practitioner or specialist
- if the patient is on a short course of anticoagulant or antiplatelet therapy, delay the non-urgent, invasive procedure until the medication has been discontinued
- plan treatment for early in the day and week, where possible, to allow time for the management of prolonged bleeding or re-bleeding if it occurs
- perform the procedure as atraumatically as possible, use appropriate local measures and only discharge the patient once hemostasis has been confirmed
- if travel time to emergency care is a concern, place particular emphasis at the time of the initial treatment on the use of measures to avoid complications
- advise the patient to take paracetamol, unless contraindicated, for pain relief rather than NSAIDs such as aspirin, ibuprofen, diclofenac or naproxen
- provide the patient with written post-treatment advice and emergency contact details
- follow the specific recommendations and advice given for the management of patients taking different anticoagulants or antiplatelet drugs

There is general agreement that in most cases, treatment regimens with older anticoagulants (e.g., warfarin) and antiplatelet agents (e.g., clopidogrel, ticlopidine, prasugrel, ticagrelor, and/or aspirin) should not be altered before dental procedures. The risks of stopping or reducing these medication regimens (i.e., thromboembolism, stroke, myocardial infarction) far outweigh the consequences of prolonged bleeding, which can be controlled with local measures. In patients with other existing medical conditions that can increase the risk of prolonged bleeding after dental treatment or receiving other therapy that can increase bleeding risk, dental practitioners may wish to consult the patient's physician to determine whether care can safely be delivered in a primary care office. Any suggested modification to the medication regimen before dental surgery should be done in consultation and on the advice of the patient's physician.

Based on limited evidence, the consensus appears to be that in most patients who are receiving the newer direct-acting oral anticoagulants (i.e., dabigatran, rivaroxaban, apixaban, or edoxaban) and undergoing dental treatment (in conjunction with usual local measures to control bleeding), no change to the anticoagulant regimen is required. In patients deemed to be at higher risk of bleeding (e.g., patients with other medical conditions or undergoing more extensive procedures associated with higher bleeding risk), consideration may be given, in consultation with and on advice of the patient's physician, to postponing the timing of the daily dose of the anticoagulant until after the procedure; timing the dental intervention as late as possible after last dose of anticoagulant; or temporarily interrupting drug therapy for 24 to 48 hours.

== Research ==
A substantial number of compounds are being investigated for use as anticoagulants. The most promising ones act on the contact activation system (factor XIIa and factor XIa); it is anticipated that this may provide agents that prevent thrombosis without conferring a risk of bleeding.

As of November 2021, the direct factor XIa inhibitor milvexian is in Phase II clinical trials for the prevention of an embolism after surgery.

=== Utilization ===
Research has been conducted on changes in anticoagulant drug supply for hospitals in the US during the COVID-19 pandemic from 2018–2022. According to researchers, "there was a 43.4% decline in the total volume of anticoagulants and antiplatelets at US hospitals in March 2020, driven by a decrease in heparin volume." Furthermore, it has been found that "Therapeutic AC [Anticoagulation] use declined from 32% in 2020 to 12% in 2022, especially after December 2021" and the introduction of the Omicron variant.

== See also ==
- CHADS2 score
- Hypercoagulability in pregnancy
