= Thrombosis =

Formation of blood clots inside the blood vessels

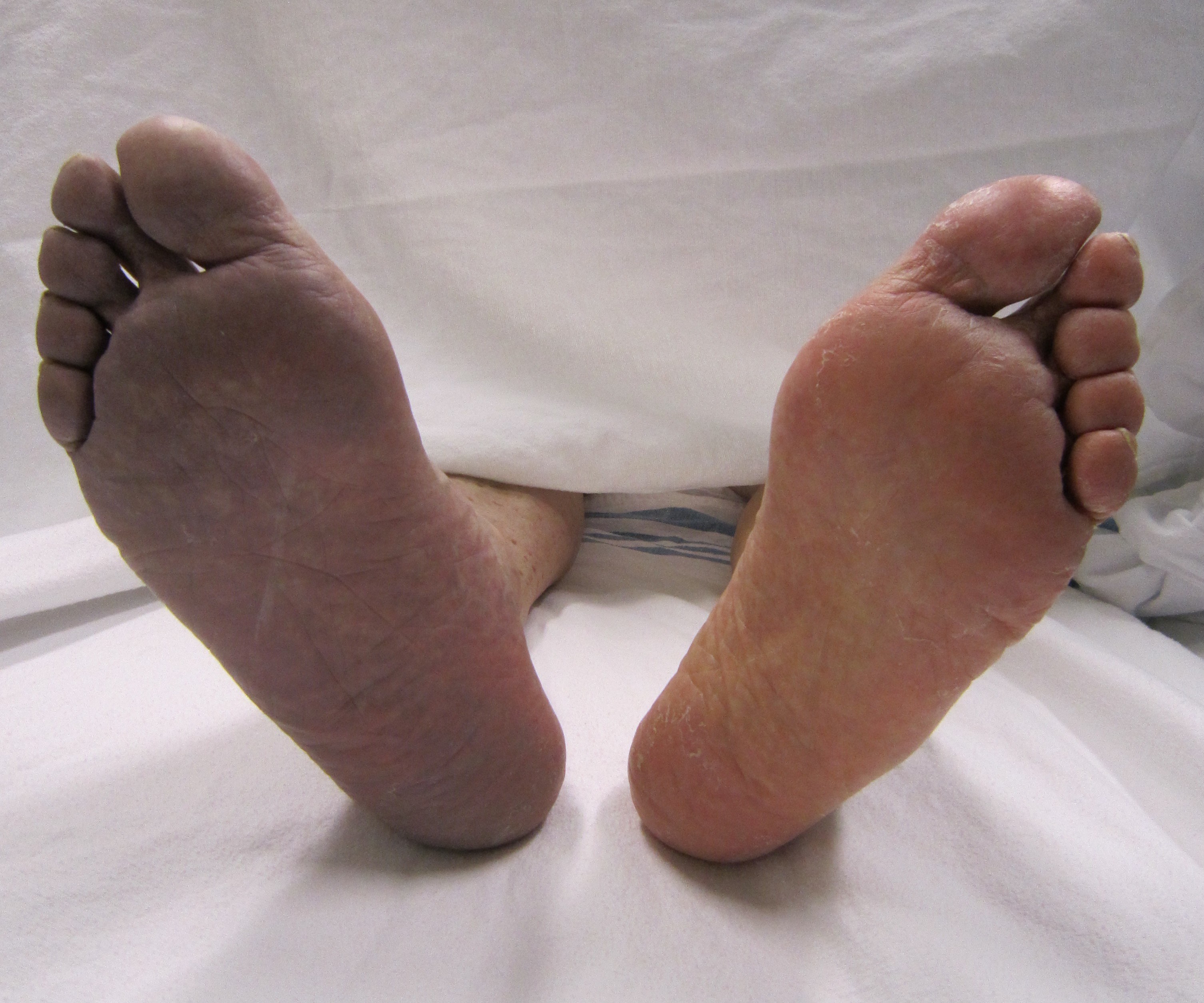
- Cyanosis of the lower right extremity, resulting from acute arterial thrombosis of the right leg (on the left side of the image)
- Specialty: Vascular surgery, internal medicine, pulmonology
- Symptoms: Dependent on location

Thrombosis (from Ancient Greek θρόμβωσις (thrómbōsis) 'clotting') is the formation of a blood clot inside a blood vessel, obstructing the flow of blood through the circulatory system. When a blood vessel (a vein or an artery) is injured, the body uses platelets (thrombocytes) and fibrin to form a blood clot to prevent blood loss. Even when a blood vessel is not injured, blood clots may form in the body under certain conditions. A clot, or a piece of the clot, that breaks free and begins to travel around the body is known as an embolus. Thrombosis can cause serious conditions such as stroke and heart attack.

Thrombosis may occur in veins (venous thrombosis) or in arteries (arterial thrombosis). Venous thrombosis (sometimes called DVT, deep vein thrombosis) leads to a blood clot in the affected part of the body, while arterial thrombosis (and, rarely, severe venous thrombosis) affects the blood supply and leads to damage of the tissue supplied by that artery (ischemia and necrosis). A piece of either an arterial or a venous thrombus can break off as an embolus, which could then travel through the circulation and lodge somewhere else as an embolism. This type of embolism is known as a thromboembolism. Complications can arise when a venous thromboembolism (commonly called a VTE) lodges in the lung as a pulmonary embolism. An arterial embolus may travel further down the affected blood vessel, where it can lodge as an embolism.

== Signs and symptoms ==
Thrombosis is generally defined by

- the type of blood vessel affected (artery or vein) and
- the precise location of the blood vessel or the organ supplied:

=== Arterial thrombosis ===
Arterial thrombosis is the formation of a thrombus within an artery. In most cases, arterial thrombosis follows rupture of atheroma (a fat-rich deposit in the blood vessel wall), and is therefore referred to as atherothrombosis. Arterial embolism occurs when clots then migrate downstream and can affect any organ. Alternatively, arterial occlusion occurs as a consequence of embolism of blood clots originating from the heart ("cardiogenic" emboli). The most common cause is atrial fibrillation, which causes a blood stasis within the atria with easy thrombus formation, but blood clots can develop inside the heart for other reasons too as infective endocarditis.

==== Stroke ====
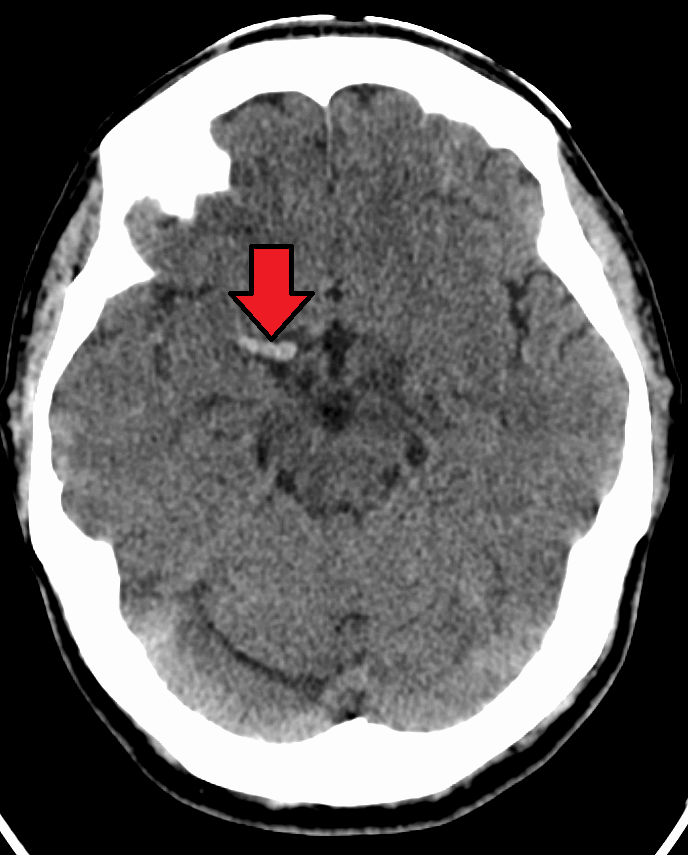
Acute thrombus in the right MCA M1 branch

A stroke is the rapid decline of brain function due to a disturbance in the supply of blood to the brain. This can be due to ischemia, thrombus, embolus (a lodged particle) or hemorrhage (a bleed).

In thrombotic stroke, a thrombus (blood clot) usually forms around atherosclerotic plaques. Since blockage of the artery is gradual, the onset of symptomatic thrombotic strokes is slower. Thrombotic stroke can be divided into two categories — large vessel disease or small vessel disease. The former affects vessels such as the internal carotids, vertebral and the circle of Willis. The latter can affect smaller vessels, such as the branches of the circle of Willis.

==== Myocardial infarction ====
Myocardial infarction (MI), or heart attack, is caused by ischemia (restriction in the blood supply), which is often due to the obstruction of a coronary artery by a thrombus. This restriction gives an insufficient supply of oxygen to the heart muscle which then results in tissue death (infarction). A lesion is then formed which is the infarct. MI can quickly become fatal if emergency medical treatment is not received promptly. If diagnosed within 12 hours of the initial episode (attack) then thrombolytic therapy is initiated.

=== Limb ischemia ===
An arterial thrombus or embolus can also form in the limbs, which can lead to acute limb ischemia.

==== Other sites ====
Hepatic artery thrombosis usually occurs as a devastating complication after liver transplantation.

=== Venous thrombosis ===
==== Deep vein thrombosis ====
Deep vein thrombosis (DVT) is the formation of a blood clot within a deep vein. It most commonly affects leg veins, such as the femoral vein.

Three factors are important in the formation of a blood clot within a deep vein—these are:

- the rate of blood flow,
- the thickness of the blood and
- qualities of the vessel wall.

Classical signs of DVT include swelling, pain and redness of the affected area.

==== Paget-Schroetter disease ====
Paget-Schroetter disease or upper extremity DVT (UEDVT) is the obstruction of an arm vein (such as the axillary vein or subclavian vein) by a thrombus. The condition usually comes to light after vigorous exercise and usually presents in younger, otherwise healthy people. Men are affected more than women.

==== Budd-Chiari syndrome ====
Budd-Chiari syndrome is the blockage of a hepatic vein or of the hepatic part of the inferior vena cava. This form of thrombosis presents with abdominal pain, ascites and enlarged liver. Treatment varies between therapy and surgical intervention by the use of shunts.

==== Portal vein thrombosis ====
Portal vein thrombosis affects the hepatic portal vein, which can lead to portal hypertension and reduction of the blood supply to the liver. It usually happens in the setting of another disease such as pancreatitis, cirrhosis, diverticulitis or cholangiocarcinoma.

==== Renal vein thrombosis ====
Renal vein thrombosis is the obstruction of the renal vein by a thrombus. This tends to lead to reduced drainage from the kidney.

==== Cerebral venous sinus thrombosis ====
Cerebral venous sinus thrombosis (CVST) is a rare form of stroke which results from the blockage of the dural venous sinuses by a thrombus. Symptoms may include headache, abnormal vision, any of the symptoms of stroke such as weakness of the face and limbs on one side of the body and seizures. The diagnosis is usually made with a CT or MRI scan. The majority of persons affected make a full recovery. The mortality rate is 4.3%.

==== Jugular vein thrombosis ====
Jugular vein thrombosis is a condition that may occur due to infection, intravenous drug use or malignancy. Jugular vein thrombosis can have a varying list of complications, including: systemic sepsis, pulmonary embolism, and papilledema. Though characterized by a sharp pain at the site of the vein, it can prove difficult to diagnose, because it can occur at random.

==== Cavernous sinus thrombosis ====
Cavernous sinus thrombosis is a specialised form of cerebral venous sinus thrombosis, where there is thrombosis of the cavernous sinus of the basal skull dura, due to the retrograde spread of infection and endothelial damage from the danger triangle of the face. The facial veins in this area anastomose with the superior and inferior ophthalmic veins of the orbit, which drain directly posteriorly into the cavernous sinus through the superior orbital fissure. Staphylococcal or Streptococcal infections of the face, for example nasal or upper lip pustules may thus spread directly into the cavernous sinus, causing stroke-like symptoms of double vision, squint, as well as spread of infection to cause meningitis.

== Causes ==
Thrombosis prevention is initiated with assessing the risk for its development. Some people have a higher risk of developing thrombosis and its possible development into thromboembolism. Some of these risk factors are related to inflammation.

"Virchow's triad" has been suggested to describe the three factors necessary for the formation of thrombosis:

- hemodynamic changes (blood stasis or turbulence),
- vessel wall (endothelial) injury/dysfunction, and
- altered blood coagulation (hypercoagulability).

Some risk factors predispose for venous thrombosis while others increase the risk of arterial thrombosis. Newborn babies in the neonatal period are also at risk of a thromboembolism.

Risk factors for thrombosis
Factor	Notes	Ref.
Previous episodes of thrombosis		
Vasoconstriction		
Slow or turbulent blood flow	slow flow is modifiable with exercise	
Stroke		
Heart failure		
Sedentary life style	modifiable	
Plaster cast	transient	
Dehydration	modifiable	
Acute respiratory failure		
Dysrhythmias		
Shock		
Obesity	modifiable	
Pregnancy and the post-partum period		
Varicose veins		
Surgery		
Trauma		
Estrogen-based oral contraceptive	discontinuation reduces risk	
Hormone replacement therapy	discontinuation reduces risk	
Ovarian hyper-stimulation therapy to treat infertility		
Compression of a vein or artery by abnormality, tumor, hematoma		
Long surgeries		
Pacing wires		
Local vein damage, incompetent valves		
Central venous catheters		
Dialysis catheters		
Repetitive motion injury		
Immobility	modifiable risk	
Spinal cord injury		
Age		
Cancers		
Sepsis		
Polycythemia		
Protein C and/or S deficiency	congenital; associated with Warfarin necrosis	
Antiphospholipid antibody syndrome	altered coagulation	
Factor V Leiden defect	altered coagulation	
Prothrombin G20210A defect	altered coagulation	
Elevated PAI-1	inhibits physiological breakdown of blood clots	
Hyperhomocysteinemia	altered coagulation	
Elevated factors II, VIII, IX, XI	altered coagulation	
Antithrombin III deficiency	altered coagulation	
Falls and hip fracture	related to immobility	
Selective estrogen-receptor modulators		
Erythropoiesis-stimulating agents		
Acute medical illness		
Inflammatory bowel disease		
Nephrotic syndrome		
Myeloproliferative disorders		
Paroxysmal nocturnal hemoglobinnuria		
Thrombophilias		
Post-menopausal hormone replacement therapy	discontinuation reduces risk	
Right heart failure		
Venous inflammation/phlebitis	when a thrombus forms, it is thrombophlebitis	
Ambient air pollution	thought to be related to inflammation	

== Mechanism ==
=== Pathogenesis ===
The main causes of thrombosis are given in Virchow's triad which lists thrombophilia, endothelial cell injury, and disturbed blood flow. Generally speaking the risk for thrombosis increases over the life course of individuals, depending on life style factors like smoking, diet, and physical activity, the presence of other diseases like cancer or autoimmune disease, while also platelet properties change in aging individuals which is an important consideration as well.

==== Hypercoagulability ====
Hypercoagulability or thrombophilia, is caused by, for example, genetic deficiencies or autoimmune disorders. Recent studies indicate that white blood cells play a pivotal role in deep vein thrombosis, mediating numerous pro-thrombotic actions.

==== Endothelial cell injury ====
Any inflammatory process, such as trauma, surgery or infection, can cause damage to the endothelial lining of the vessel's wall. The main mechanism is exposure of tissue factor to the blood coagulation system. Inflammatory and other stimuli (such as hypercholesterolemia) can lead to changes in gene expression in endothelium producing to a pro-thrombotic state. When this occurs, endothelial cells downregulate substances such as thrombomodulin, which is a key modulator of thrombin activity. The result is a sustained activation of thrombin and reduced production of protein C and tissue factor inhibitor, which furthers the pro-thrombotic state.

Endothelial injury is almost invariably involved in the formation of thrombi in arteries, as high rates of blood flow normally hinder clot formation. In addition, arterial and cardiac clots are normally rich in platelets–which are required for clot formation in areas under high stress due to blood flow.

==== Disturbed blood flow ====
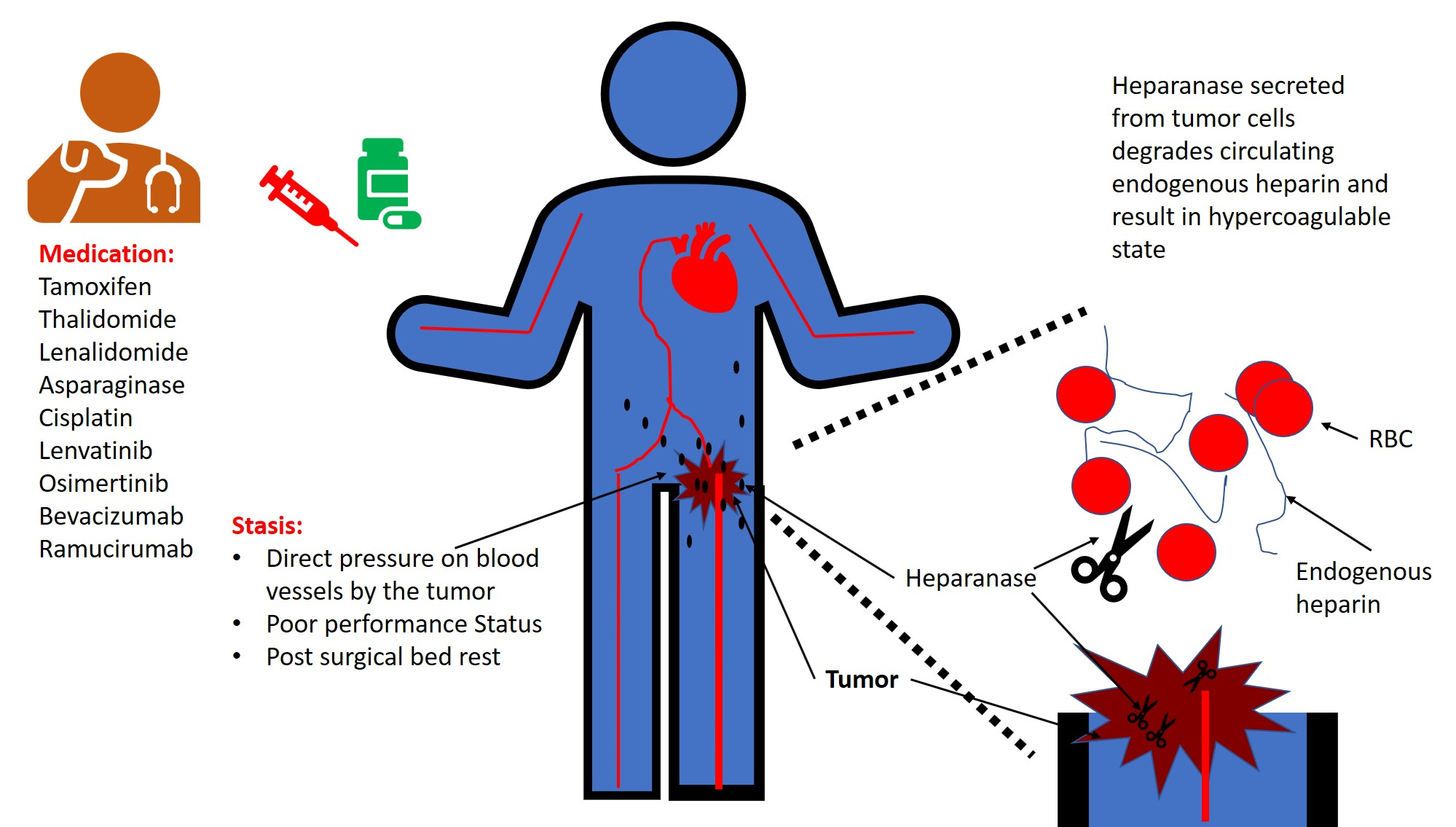
Cancer-associated thrombosis can result from: (1) stasis, i.e., direct pressure on blood vessels by the tumor mass, poor performance status, and bed rest following surgical procedures; (2) iatrogenic, due to treatment with antineoplastic medications; and (3) secretion of heparanase from malignant tumors that results in degradation of endogenous heparin.

Causes of disturbed blood flow include stagnation of blood flow past the point of injury, or venous stasis which may occur in heart failure, or after long periods of sedentary behaviour, such as sitting on a long airplane flight. Also, atrial fibrillation, causes stagnant blood in the left atrium (LA), or left atrial appendage (LAA), and can lead to a thromboembolism. Cancers or malignancies such as leukemia may cause increased risk of thrombosis by possible activation of the coagulation system by cancer cells or secretion of procoagulant substances (paraneoplastic syndrome), by external compression on a blood vessel when a solid tumor is present, or (more rarely) extension into the vasculature (for example, renal cell cancers extending into the renal veins). Also, treatments for cancer (radiation, chemotherapy) often cause additional hypercoagulability. There are scores that correlate different aspects of patient data (comorbidities, vital signs, and others) to risk of thrombosis, such as the POMPE-C, which stratifies risk of mortality due to pulmonary embolism in patients with cancer, who typically have higher rates of thrombosis. Also, there are several predictive scores for thromboembolic events, such as Padua, Khorana, and ThroLy score.

=== Pathophysiology ===
==== Natural history ====
Fibrinolysis is the physiological breakdown of blood clots by enzymes such as plasmin.

Organisation: following the thrombotic event, residual vascular thrombus will be re-organised histologically with several possible outcomes. For an occlusive thrombus (defined as thrombosis within a small vessel that leads to complete occlusion), wound healing will reorganise the occlusive thrombus into collagenous scar tissue, where the scar tissue will either permanently obstruct the vessel, or contract down with myofibroblastic activity to unblock the lumen. For a mural thrombus (defined as a thrombus in a large vessel that restricts the blood flow but does not occlude completely), histological reorganisation of the thrombus does not occur via the classic wound healing mechanism. Instead, the platelet-derived growth factor degranulated by the clotted platelets will attract a layer of smooth muscle cells to cover the clot, and this layer of mural smooth muscle will be vascularised by the blood inside the vessel lumen rather than by the vasa vasorum.

Ischemia/infarction: if an arterial thrombus cannot be lysed by the body and it does not embolise, and if the thrombus is large enough to impair or occlude blood flow in the involved artery, then local ischemia or infarction will result. A venous thrombus may or may not be ischemic, since veins distribute deoxygenated blood that is less vital for cellular metabolism. Nevertheless, non-ischemic venous thrombosis may still be problematic, due to the swelling caused by blockage to venous drainage. In deep vein thrombosis this manifests as pain, redness, and swelling; in retinal vein occlusion this may result in macular oedema and visual acuity impairment, which if severe enough can lead to blindness.

==== Embolization ====
A thrombus may become detached and enter circulation as an embolus, finally lodging in and completely obstructing a blood vessel, which unless treated very quickly will lead to tissue necrosis (an infarction) in the area past the occlusion. Venous thrombosis can lead to pulmonary embolism when the migrated embolus becomes lodged in the lung. In people with a "shunt" (a connection between the pulmonary and systemic circulation), either in the heart or in the lung, a venous clot can also end up in the arteries and cause arterial embolism.

Arterial embolism can lead to obstruction of blood flow through the blood vessel that is obstructed by it, and a lack of oxygen and nutrients (ischemia) of the downstream tissue. The tissue can become irreversibly damaged, a process known as necrosis. This can affect any organ; for instance, arterial embolism of the brain is one of the causes of stroke.

== Prevention ==
The use of heparin following surgery is common if there are no issues with bleeding. Generally, a risk-benefit analysis is required, as all anticoagulants lead to an increased risk of bleeding. In people admitted to hospital, thrombosis is a major cause for complications and occasionally death. In the UK, for instance, the Parliamentary Health Select Committee heard in 2005 that the annual rate of death due to thrombosis was 25,000, with at least 50% of these being hospital-acquired. Hence thromboprophylaxis (prevention of thrombosis) is increasingly emphasized. In patients admitted for surgery, graded compression stockings are widely used, and in severe illness, prolonged immobility and in all orthopedic surgery, professional guidelines recommend low molecular weight heparin (LMWH) administration, mechanical calf compression or (if all else is contraindicated and the patient has recently developed deep vein thrombosis) the insertion of a vena cava filter. In patients with medical rather than surgical illness, LMWH too is known to prevent thrombosis, and in the United Kingdom the Chief Medical Officer has issued guidance to the effect that preventative measures should be used in medical patients, in anticipation of formal guidelines.

== Treatment ==
The treatment for thrombosis depends on whether it is in a vein or an artery, the impact on the person, and the risk of complications from treatment.

=== Anticoagulation ===
Warfarin and vitamin K antagonists are anticoagulants that can be taken orally to reduce thromboembolic occurrence. Where a more effective response is required, heparin can be given (by injection) concomitantly. As a side effect of any anticoagulant, the risk of bleeding is increased, so the international normalized ratio of blood is monitored. Self-monitoring and self-management are safe options for competent patients, though their practice varies. In Germany, about 20% of patients were self-managed while only 1% of U.S. patients did home self-testing (according to one 2012 study). Other medications such as direct thrombin inhibitors and direct Xa inhibitors are increasingly being used instead of warfarin.

=== Thrombolysis ===
Thrombolysis is the pharmacological destruction of blood clots by administering thrombolytic drugs including recombinant tissue plasminogen activator, which enhances the normal destruction of blood clots by the body's enzymes. This carries an increased risk of bleeding so is generally only used for specific situations (such as severe stroke or a massive pulmonary embolism).

=== Surgery ===
Arterial thrombosis may require surgery if it causes acute limb ischemia.

=== Endovascular treatment ===
Mechanical clot retrieval and catheter-guided thrombolysis are used in certain situations.

=== Antiplatelet agents ===
Arterial thrombosis is platelet-rich, and inhibition of platelet aggregation with antiplatelet drugs such as aspirin may reduce the risk of recurrence or progression.

=== Targeting ischemia/reperfusion injury ===
With reperfusion comes ischemia/reperfusion (IR) injury (IRI), which paradoxically causes cell death in reperfused tissue and contributes significantly to post-reperfusion mortality and morbidity. For example, in a feline model of intestinal ischemia, four hours of ischemia resulted in less injury than three hours of ischemia followed by one hour of reperfusion. In ST-elevation myocardial infarction (STEMI), IRI contributes up to 50% of final infarct size despite timely primary percutaneous coronary intervention. This is a key reason for the continued high mortality and morbidity in these conditions, despite endovascular reperfusion treatments and continuous efforts to improve timeliness and access to these treatments. Hence, protective therapies are required to attenuate IRI alongside reperfusion in acute ischemic conditions to improve clinical outcomes. Therapeutic strategies that have potential to improve clinical outcomes in reperfused STEMI patients include remote ischemic conditioning (RIC), exenatide, and metoprolol. These have emerged amongst a multitude of cardioprotective interventions investigated with largely neutral clinical data. Of these, RIC has the most robust clinical evidence, especially in the context of STEMI, but also emerging for other indications such as acute ischemic stroke and aneurysmal subarachnoid hemorrhage.

=== Neonatal thrombosis ===
Treatment options for full-term and preterm babies who develop thromboembolism include expectant management (with careful observation), nitroglycerin ointment, pharmacological therapy (thrombolytics and/or anticoagulants), and surgery. The evidence supporting these treatment approaches is weak. For anticoagulant treatment, it is not clear if unfractionated and/or low molecular weight heparin treatment is effective at decreasing mortality and serious adverse events in this population. There is also insufficient evidence to understand the risk of adverse effects associated with these treatment approaches in term or preterm infants.

== See also ==
- Blood clotting tests
- Disseminated intravascular coagulation
- Hepatic artery thrombosis
- Thrombotic microangiopathy
