= Hepatic artery thrombosis =

- Specialty: Gastroenterology
- Diagnostic method: Ultrasound with doppler
- Treatment: Anticoagulant medications, Fibrinolytic therapy, Surgery, Liver Transplantation

Hepatic artery thrombosis occurs when a blood clot forms in the artery that provides blood flow to the liver. Hepatic artery thrombosis may occur as a complication after liver transplantation, and represents the most common complication of liver transplantation. Smoking tobacco increases the risk of hepatic artery thrombosis in people who have undergone liver transplantation.

Hepatic artery thrombosis may cause severe elevations in serum aminotransferases, alanine transaminase (ALT) and aspartate transaminase (AST). Often the AST is greater than the ALT. Hepatic artery thrombosis is usually diagnosed with ultrasound with doppler, although it may be diagnosed using computed tomography (CT) or magnetic resonance imaging (MRI).

The treatment for recently developed or acute hepatic artery thrombosis include anticoagulant medications, fibrinolytic therapy to break up the blood clot, or surgical revascularization. If acute hepatic artery thrombosis occurs after liver transplantation, then retransplantation with a new liver may be necessary.

== Signs and symptoms ==
Hepatic artery thrombosis can cause severe elevations in serum liver enzymes, AST and ALT. Often the AST is greater than the ALT. When it occurs after liver transplantation, it usually develops within 4 months after surgery.

== Diagnosis ==
Hepatic artery thrombosis is diagnosed with ultrasound with doppler, which shows a lack of blood flow through the hepatic artery. Hepatic artery thrombosis may also be diagnosed using CT or MR imaging, which would show evidence of a blood clot within the hepatic artery.

== Treatment ==
Treatment for acute hepatic artery thrombosis include anticoagulant medications, fibrinolysis therapies to break up the blood clot, or surgical revascularization. If acute hepatic artery thrombosis occurs after liver transplantation, then retransplantation with a new liver may be necessary.

However, chronic hepatic artery thrombosis may not require therapy, as the gradual development of additional blood vessels (collateral circulation) may be adequate for the metabolic needs of the liver.

== Prognosis ==
The development of hepatic artery thrombosis soon after liver transplantation is associated with higher risk of death (mortality) and transplanted liver failure (graft loss).

== Epidemiology ==
Hepatic artery thrombosis is the most common complication that occurs after liver transplantation. Hepatic artery thrombosis may also occur after other surgeries. Hepatic artery thrombosis and primary non-function are the two most common reason that a transplanted liver fails to work (graft failure). Among people who receive liver transplants, smoking tobacco increases the risk of hepatic artery thrombosis.
