= ThroLy score =

The Thrombosis Lymphoma (ThroLy) predictive score is a multivariable model for assessing the probability of thromboembolic events in patients with lymphoma. (Multivariable models are those that incorporate multiple independent variables.)

== Characteristics ==
The ThroLy score was developed and published in 2016 by a group of physicians from Serbia and the United States. As a simple model, it was initially internally validated based on individual clinical and laboratory patient characteristics that identify lymphoma patients at risk for a thromboembolic event. Based on an investigation that was conducted on derivation and validation cohorts, it was determined that the variables independently associated with a risk of thromboembolism in lymphoma patients are: previous venous and/or arterial events; mediastinal involvement; a BMI greater than 30 kg/m^{2}; reduced mobility; extra-nodal localization; neutropenia; and a hemoglobin level less than 100g/L.

Patient characteristics	Assigned score
Previous venous thromboembolic event	2
Reduced mobility	1
Previous acute myocardial infarction or stroke	2
Obesity (BMI ≥ 30)	2
Extranodal localization	1
Mediastinal involvement	2
Neutropenia	1
Hemoglobin˂100g/L	1

== Risk classification ==
Based on the risk score, patients with lymphoma can be classified into three different risk groups.

Risk group	ThroLy score
Low risk	0-1
Intermediate risk	2-3
High risk	≥4

== Further validations ==
The ThroLy score considers some particular characteristics of lymphoma patients, such as extranodal localization and mediastinal involvement. In addition to having a strong positive predictive value, the score is not limited to either hospitalized or outpatient settings, and does not require non-routine laboratory analyses. ThroLy score has been validated by multiple studies and entered clinical practice in several medical centers. However, multiple validation studies are ongoing and the results of additional studies may be needed before it can be fully applicable in clinical practice worldwide; several validation studies have been performed, and several more are ongoing.
